= List of advocacy groups in Canada =

The List of advocacy groups in Canada includes groups engaged in advocating for a common political, economic, or social interest.

== Definition ==
According to the government of Canada, social advocacy groups "comprises establishments primarily engaged in promoting a particular social or political cause intended to benefit a broad or specific constituency". Some advocacy organizations "solicit contributions or sell memberships to support their activities".

== Types of advocacy groups ==
The government of Canada subdivides advocacy groups into "accident prevention associations, advocacy groups, animal rights organizations, antipoverty advocacy organizations, associations for retired persons, advocacy civil liberties groups, community action advocacy groups, conservation advocacy groups, drug abuse prevention advocacy organizations, environmental advocacy groups, humane society (advocacy group), natural resource prevention organizations, neighborhood development advocacy groups, peace advocacy groups, public interest groups (e.g., environment conservation, human rights, wildlife), social Service advocacy organizations, taxpayers advocacy organizations, and tenant advocacy associations". Advocacy groups are further divided into micro (1–4), small (5-99), medium (100–499) and large (500+).

In Bill C-86, Budget Implementation Act, 2018, the government adopted recommendations of the Report of the Consultation Panel on the Political Activities of Charities, which affirmed that charitable organizations can engage in public policy dialogue and development activities (PPDDA or P2D2A) that support their charitable purposes. As a result, the Income Tax Act (ITA) was revised to change the "long-standing requirement that charities must be constituted and operated exclusively for charitable purposes". The changes to the ITA now allow charitable organizations to engage in advocacy in support of its stated charitable purpose(s) but they are not allowed to engage in advocacy for a "political purpose".

== Advocacy groups ==
=== A ===
- Abortion Rights Coalition of Canada (ARCC) is a Vancouver, British Columbia-headquartered pro-choice registered non-profit—but not a charity interest group founded in 2005. It is currently the only political group in Canada which is engaged in pro-abortion activism on a national level.
- Alberta Biodiversity Monitoring Institute (ABMI) (2003 –) a provincial organization funded by the provincial government and the oil and gas industry.
- Alberta Wilderness Association Environment Ci A rating 2020
- Ancient Forest Alliance political
- Anishinaabe tribal political organizations political
- Anishinabek Nation political
- Anti-Corruption and Accountability Canada political
- Anti-Poverty Committee political
- Apathy is Boring political
- Autistics for Autistics disability rights

=== B ===
- Black Law Students' Association of Canada civil rights
- Black Lives Matter civil rights, political
- Black Action Defence Committee political
- Black United Front civil rights
- Blueprint For Canada Public education K-12 policy platform
- British Columbia Civil Liberties Association civil rights, political
- Bruce Trail Conservancy Environment, Ci A rating 2020
- Bulgarian National Front political
- Bus Riders Union (Vancouver) political

=== C ===
- Calgary Food Bank Social Service > Food banks, Ci A+ rating 2020
- Campaign 2000 political
- Campaign Life Coalition anti-abortion
- Canada's Ecofiscal Commission political
- Canada Strong and Free Network not-for-profit that was formerly the Calgary, Alberta-based Manning Centre, that operates the Manning Foundation, a for-profit think tank that promotes conservative principles
- Canadian Alliance of Student Associations political
- Canadian Anti-racism Education and Research Society civil rights
- Canadian Association of Retired Persons (CARP) not-for-profit, non-partisan, seniors advocacy group
- Canadian Bankers Association political
- Canadian Centre for Bio-Ethical Reform anti-abortion
- Canadian Civil Liberties Association civil rights, political
- Canadian Council for Refugees political
- Canadian Council of Natural Mothers political
- Canadian Federation of Independent Business political
- Canadian Injured Workers Alliance political
- Canadian Jewish Congress (CJC) (1919–2011), which was affiliated with the World Jewish Congress was headquartered in Ottawa. It was a subsidiary of the Centre for Israel and Jewish Affairs—the Canadian Council for Israel and Jewish Advocacy—in 2007 and was disbanded in 2011. The JCC was the main advocacy group for the Jewish community in Canada from 1919 to 2011, advocating for human rights, social equality, Canadian immigration reform and civil and political rights in Canada.
- Canadian Jewish Political Affairs Committee political
- Canadian Radio League political
- Canadian Snowbird Association political
- Canadian Wildlife Federation is an Ottawa-based Canadian non-profit organization founded in 1961 whose mandate is wildlife conservation in Canada.
- Canadian Youth for Choice abortion rights
- Canadians for Equal Marriage LGBT (Lesbian, Gay, Bisexual, Transgender) rights
- Canadians for Justice and Peace in the Middle East political
- Catholic Civil Rights League anti-abortion
- Catholic Medical Association anti-abortion
- Catholic Organization for Life and Family anti-abortion
- Centre for Israel and Jewish Affairs political
- Center for Research-Action on Race Relations civil rights
- Charity Intelligence Canada (Ci) charity watchdog, charity assessment
- Citizens for a Canadian Republic political
- Citizens for Public Justice political
- Coalition Against the Marcos Dictatorship political
- Committee on Monetary and Economic Reform political
- Community Air political
- Council of Alberta University Students political

=== D ===
- David Suzuki Foundation environmental
- Democracy Watch

=== E ===
- Ecojustice Environment, Ci A rating 2020
- East York Learning Experience Education, Ci A rating 2020
- Egale Canada LGBT rights
- Electronic Frontier Canada political

=== F ===
- Fair Vote Canada (FVC) is a Kitchener, Ontario-based grassroots, nonprofit, multi-partisan citizens' movement—created in June 2001—that calls for the replacement of the first-past-the-post electoral system with proportional representation, as part of electoral reform in Canada.
- Friends of Canadian Broadcasting political
- Focus on the Family Canada anti-abortion
- Foundation for Equal Families LGBT rights

=== G ===
- Gay Alliance Toward Equality LGBT rights
- Gay Liberation Front LGBT rights
- Generation Squeeze political
- Generation Screwed political

=== I ===
- Independent Jewish Voices (Canada) political
- Indspire Education, Ci A rating 2020
- International Conservation Fund of Canada Environment, Ci A rating 2020
- International Railroad for Queer Refugees LGBTQ rights
- Iranian Queer Organization LGBT rights
- The Isaac Foundation patients rights

=== J ===
- Justice Centre for Constitutional Freedoms political

=== L ===
- Lambda Foundation LGBT rights
- Law Union of Ontario civil rights
- LGBTory LGBT rights
- Leadnow political
- League for Social Reconstruction political
- Liberals for Life anti-abortion
- Life Chain anti-abortion
- Ligue des droits et libertés civil rights

=== M ===
- MADD Canada political
- Migrant Action Centre social justice
- MiningWatch Canada political
- Modern Miracle Network pro-fossil fuel, political
- More Neighbours Toronto housing advocacy
- Monarchist League of Canada political

=== N ===
- National Action Committee on the Status of Women abortion rights,
- National Citizens Coalition (NCC) is a Canadian conservative lobby group, founded in 1967, that has "promoted freedom" for fifty years. The Coalition supports smaller government, cuts to social spending, abolition of medicare, extra-billing by doctors, lower taxes for the wealthy and is against public sector unions. The Coalition was successful in persuading Justice Medhurst of the Alberta Supreme Court to strike down the 1983 federal restrictions on non-party campaign expenditures as an interference with freedom of expression. The NCC spent hundreds of thousands of dollars to help Conservatives win the 1984 federal election, the first Conservative majority government in 30 years.
- National Council of Canadian Muslims civil rights
- NATO Association of Canada political

=== O ===
- Ontario Autism Coalition political
- Online Rights Canada political
- Ontario Coalition Against Poverty political
- Ontario Health Coalition political
- OpenMedia political
- Option citoyenne political
- Option consommateurs political
- Option Resurgence Network For Human Rights Human Rights Advocacy

=== P ===
- Pathways to Education Education, Ci A+ rating 2020
- Pembina Institute
- PFLAG Canada LGBT rights
- Pilgrims of Saint Michael political
- Polaris Institute political
- Pro-Choice Action Network abortion rights
- Pro-Life Alberta Political Association anti-abortion
- Progressive Group for Independent Business political
- ProudPolitics LGBT rights

=== Q ===
- Queers Against Israeli Apartheid LGBT rights

=== R ===
- Rainbow Railroad LGBT rights
- Raging Grannies political
- REAL Women of Canada anti-abortion, political
- Rideau Institute political
- RightOnCanada.ca political
- Right to Privacy Committee LGBT rights
- Rock for Choice abortion rights

=== S ===
- Samara (charitable organisation) political
- Sex Professionals of Canada political
- SoChange political

=== T ===
- The Compass Social Service > Food banks, Ci A rating 2020
- Toronto Environmental Alliance political
- Toronto Public Space Committee political
- Transparency International Canada anti-corruption
- Transport Action Canada political

=== U ===
- United Nations Association in Canada political

=== V ===
- Voice of Canadians political
- Voices-Voix political
- Vote Marriage Canada political

=== W ===
- WE Charity
- Wildrose Party of Alberta political
- World Federalist Movement-Canada political
- World Vision Canada International aid, Ci A+ rating 2020

=== Y ===
- You Can Play LGBT rights
