= Environmental issues in Alberta =

The Canadian province of Alberta faces a number of environmental issues related to natural resource extraction—including oil and gas industry with its oil sands—endangered species, melting glaciers in banff, floods and droughts, wildfires, and global climate change. While the oil and gas industries generates substantial economic wealth, the Athabasca oil sands, which are situated almost entirely in Alberta, are the "fourth most carbon intensive on the planet behind Algeria, Venezuela and Cameroon" according to an August 8, 2018 article in the American Association for the Advancement of Science's journal Science. This article details some of the environmental issues including past ecological disasters in Alberta and describes some of the efforts at the municipal, provincial and federal level to mitigate the risks and impacts.

According to the 2019 report Canada's Changing Climate Report, which was commissioned by Environment and Climate Change Canada, Canada's annual average temperature over land has warmed by 1.7 C since 1948. The rate of warming is even higher in Canada's North, in the Prairies and northern British Columbia. The Intergovernmental Panel on Climate Change's (IPCC) October 8, 2018 Special Report on Global Warming of 1.5 °C set a target of 1.5 °C (2.7 °F) that would require "deep emissions reductions" and that "[g]lobal net human-caused emissions of carbon dioxide (CO2) would need to fall by about 45 percent from 2010 levels by 2030, reaching 'net zero' around 2050" for global warming to be limited to 1.5 °C.

The Canadian oil and gas industry produces "60 per cent of all industrial emissions in Canada" and Alberta has the largest oil and gas industry in the country. By September 2017, Alberta had already begun "implementing broad climate change policies" including a "sophisticated two-tier carbon pricing system" for consumers and major emitters. This represented a "first step in broadening the tax base". The province set a "target cap for greenhouse gas emissions" and began the transformation to lower-carbon with coal being phased out for electricity production. Some involved in the energy industry were "voluntarily expanding into renewables and lower-carbon energy sources." The first act introduced by Premier Jason Kenney as promised in his United Conservative Party (UCP) election platform was An Act to Repeal the Carbon Tax, which received Royal Assent on June 4, 2019.

Raw bitumen extracted from the oil sands in northern Alberta is shipped in Canada and to the United States through pipelines, railway, and trucks. Environmental concerns about the unintended consequences of the oil sands industry are linked to environmental issues in the rest of Canada. While pipelines are considered to be the most efficient and safest of the three methods, concerns have been raised about pipeline expansion because of climate change, the risk of pipeline leaks, increased oil tanker traffic and higher risk of oil tanker spills, and violations of First Nations' rights.

== Overview ==
Environmental liabilities include emissions from a number of sources including the oil and gas industry with the oil sands tailings ponds, oil spills and tailings dam failures, pipelines, reclamation including orphan wells. Others environmental issues include melting glaciers, wildfires, extreme weather events—including floods and droughts, species at risk such as the boreal woodland caribou and bull trout, and invasive destructive species, such as the mountain pine beetle. (Note: An April 10, 2019 article in The Narwhal listed eight environmental issues of concern including energy efficiency, the oil sands emissions cap, environmental liabilities in the oil and gas sector, wilderness and parks, reclamation, methane regulations, carbon tax, and emissions trends.) Potential solutions include energy efficiency, reclamation, regulatory instruments for measuring, monitoring and managing greenhouse gases including methane, carbon dioxide, carbon pricing including a carbon tax, wilderness and parks.

== Greenhouse gas emissions ==
Environment Canada monitors greenhouse gas emissions, including "carbon dioxide (CO_{2}), methane (CH_{4}), nitrous oxide (N_{2}O), perfluorocarbons (PFCs), hydrofluorocarbons (HFCs), sulphur hexafluoride (SF6) and nitrogen trifluoride (NF3)". The sources of GHG were grouped into five sectors: energy; industrial processes and product use (IPPU); agriculture; waste, and land use, land-use change; and forestry (LULUCF).

=== Air quality ===
By September 9, 2015, then-Environment Minister Shannon Phillips warned that Alberta was "on track to have the worst air quality in Canada". The 2015 Canadian Ambient Air Quality Standards report showed that the Red Deer area had "exceeded the acceptable amount of particulate matter and ozone exposure" from 2011 through 2013. Although the health risk was low, Phillips called on the Red Deer area, "the lower Athabasca, upper Athabasca, North Saskatchewan and South Saskatchewan" whose air quality was also at risk, to develop plans to prevent their air quality levels from deteriorating. Todd Loewen, then-Wildrose environment critic, said Phillips was over-reacting. By 2018, the Alberta Environment and Parks research on the composition of the fine particulate matter that endangers health at any levels, indicated that "nitrogen dioxide and volatile compounds"—that are "associated with industry—make up a lot of the fine particulate matter in the Red Deer region".

A May 14, 2019 Data Trending and Comparison Report by Fort Air Partnership (FAP) showed that in their study area—which includes a "4,500 square-kilometre airshed near Edmonton", "levels of sulphur dioxide, nitrogen oxide and carbon monoxide" have been decreasing since the late 1980s.

From 2017 to May 2019, Bluesource's Methane Reduction Program retrofitted 4,000 high-bleed pneumatic controllers with units that emitted less CO2e for 15 oil and gas producers which cut estimated emissions by "180,000 tonnes of CO2e in 2018 and saved oil and gas producers over $4 million in capital expenditures."

==== Greenhouse gases emissions in Alberta (1990-2017) ====
Map of Canada showing the increases in GHG emissions by province/territory in 2008, compared to the 1990 base year. 50%+ increase 30%-50% increase 20%-30% increase 10%-20% increase 0%-10% increase 0%-10% decrease Each square represents 2 tonnes CO_{2} eq. per capita

According to the federal data published in the National Observer on February 20, 2019, in 2016 the provinces total emissions of CO_{2} equivalent amounted to 262.9 megatonnes (MT) with 17 per cent from the electrical sector and 48 per cent from the oil and gas sector.

Alberta's CO_{2} equivalent kilotonne (kt) increased to 273,000 kt in 2017 from 171,000 kt in 1990. From 2005 to 2017 it increased by 18%, mainly because of "the expansion of oil and gas operations."

The total of CO_{2} equivalent emissions in 2017 for all of Canada was 714,000 kt. In contrast, Ontario, the second largest emitter, had a total of 159,000 CO_{2} equivalent kt in 2017 representing a decrease from 1990 when it was 180,000 kt. Between 2005 and 2017, Ontario saw a decrease of −22% largely because of the closing of "coal-fired electricity generation plants".

Alberta

year	kt CO_{2} equivalent
1990	171,000
1995	200,000
2000	226,000
2004	234,000
2005	231,000
2006	234,000
2007	246,000
2008	244,000
2012	261,000
2013	271,000
2014	276,000
2015	275,000
2016	264,000
2017	273,000

Canada (Note: Some emissions are only reported at the national level.)

year	kt CO_{2} equivalent
1990	589,461
1995	635,330
2000	709,320
2004	738,380
2005	728,876
2006	715,524
2007	747,837
2008	731,131
2012	711,000
2013	722,000
2014	723,000
2015	722,000
2016	708,000
2017	714,000

"According to the Alberta government, the impact of methane as a greenhouse gas is, "25 times greater than carbon dioxide over a 100-year period." In 2014, Alberta's oil and gas sector emitted 31.4 megatonnes of methane (measured in carbon dioxide equivalent)." Alberta set 45-per-cent-by-2025 methane emission reduction targets.

== The oil and gas sector ==
The oil and gas industry produces "60 per cent of all industrial emissions in Canada" and Alberta has the largest oil and gas industry. (Note: The Alberta oil industry has made technological improvements. According to a May 2019 The Financial Post, the "two most recent oil sands mining projects now "produce diluted bitumen blends" similar to an average barrel of US crude oil's emissions.)

According to Natural Resources Canada (NRCAN), because of increased oil and gas production from 2005 through 2016, GHG emissions in Canada increased 16%, particularly through in-situ extraction.

By 2015, Venezuela accounted for 18%, Saudi Arabia for 16.1%, and Canada for 10.3% of the world's proven oil reserves, according to NRCAN. Based on a May 2019 report, Alberta's total oil production in March, 2019 was 17.09 million cubic metres and 17.088 million cubic metres in March 2018. (Note: According to a Washington, DC-based U.S. Energy Information Administration (EIA) report, In 2018, the United States imported about 4.28 million barrels per day (MMb/d) of petroleum Canada representing 43% of US oil imports. Saudi Arabia accounted for 9%; Mexico accounted for 7%, Venezuela for 6%, and Iraq for 5%.)

=== Oil sands tailings ponds ===
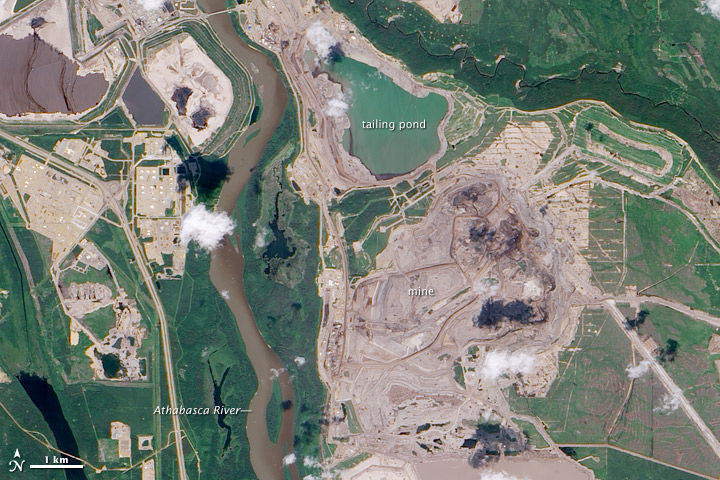
Oil sands tailings ponds

By 2016, NRCAN reported that the growth of annual production of oil sands, in spite of significant technological advances, presents several environmental challenges to land, water, air, and energy conservation. One of the most difficult environmental challenges facing the oil industry is the management of the oil sands tailings ponds, which hold large volumes of tailings, the byproduct of bitumen extraction from the oil sands, which contain a mixture of salts, suspended solids and other dissolvable chemical compounds such as acids, benzene, hydrocarbons residual bitumen, fine silts and water.

Tailings ponds in Alberta held c. 732 billion litres in 2008 and by 2013 they covered about 77 square kilometres (30 sq mi). By 2017 this increased to c."1.2 trillion litres of contaminated water" and then covered about 220 square kilometres (85 sq mi). In 2009, as tailing ponds continued to proliferate and volumes of fluid tailings increased, the Energy Resources Conservation Board of Alberta issued Directive 074 to force oil companies to manage tailings based on aggressive criteria. In 2015, regulators replaced 074 with Directive 085, which allowed the oil industry to release fluid fine tailings (FFT) into tailings ponds. In a June 3, 2019 The Globe and Mail article, limnologist David Schindler expressed concerns about new regulations at both the provincial and federal level authorizing the "discharge of treated effluence" from oil sands tailings ponds into the Athabasca River.

The industry has been fined under the federal Migratory Birds Convention Act (MBCA) and Alberta's Environmental Protection and Enhancement Act in 2018 and 2010 for the deaths of great blue herons at the MLSB, and over 1,606 ducks in Syncrude's oil sands tailings ponds. Syncrude's fine of $3 million was the largest to date.

=== Oil sands emissions ===
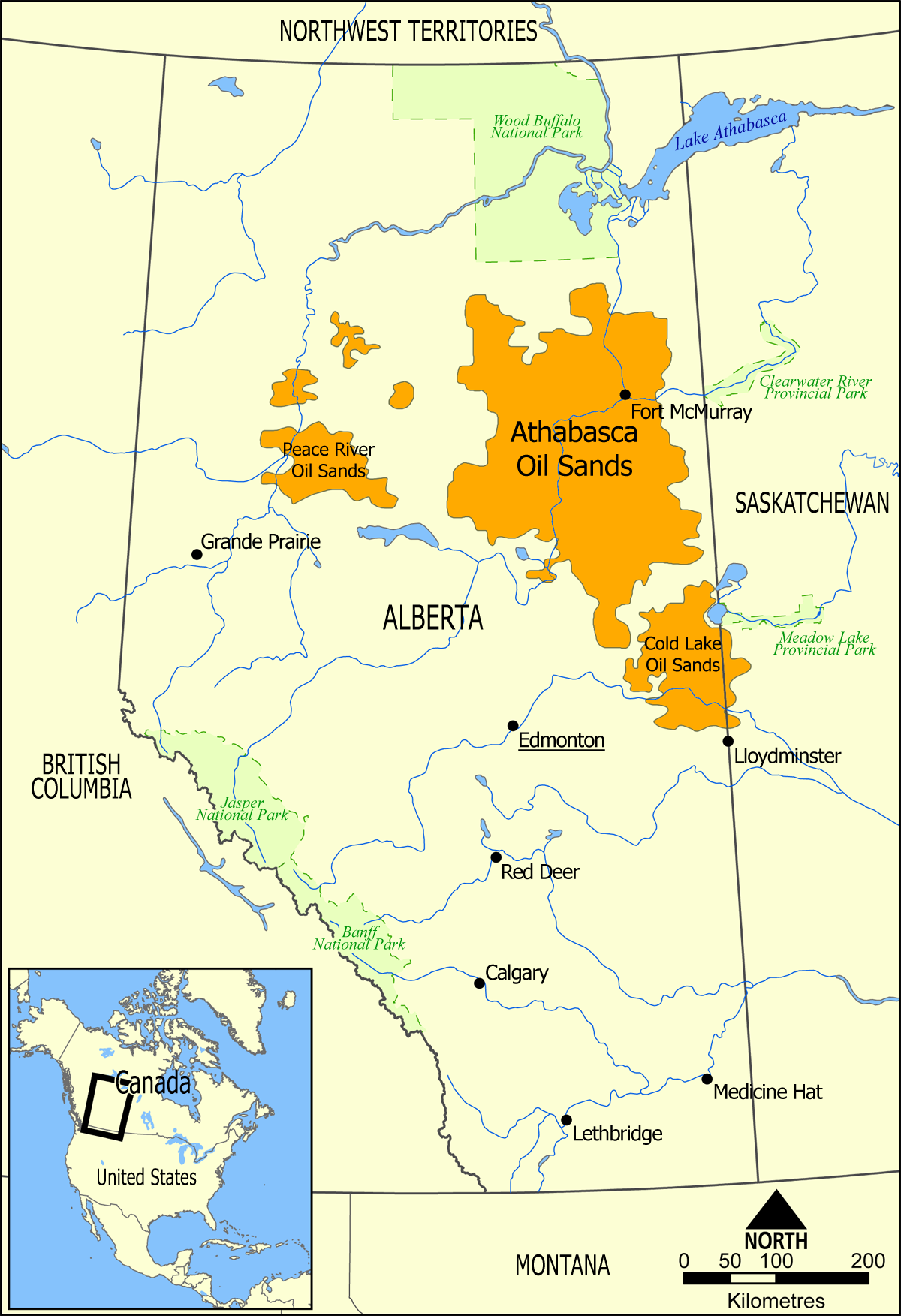
Athabasca oil sands

The Athabasca oil sands, which are situated almost entirely in Alberta, are the "fourth most carbon intensive on the planet behind Algeria, Venezuela and Cameroon" according to an August 8, 2018 article in the American Association for the Advancement of Science's journal Science. Their research concluded that "Canada's rating was nearly twice the global average".

Scientists from Environment Canada and Queen's University published their research in the January 2013 issue of the Proceedings of the National Academy of Sciences journal (PNAS) in which they described innovative methods to measure the polycyclic aromatic hydrocarbons (PAH) in core samples from lakes including a remote lake, Namur Lake, which is situated 50 km from the sampling site, AR6, on the Athabasca River, and had a "high atmospheric PAH deposition. They found that the sedimentary profiles from the core samples revealed "striking PAH trajectories" that "reflect the decades-long impacts of oil sands development on lake ecosystems, including remote Namur Lake. This temporal PAH pattern was not recognized previously by industry-funded oil sands monitoring programs."

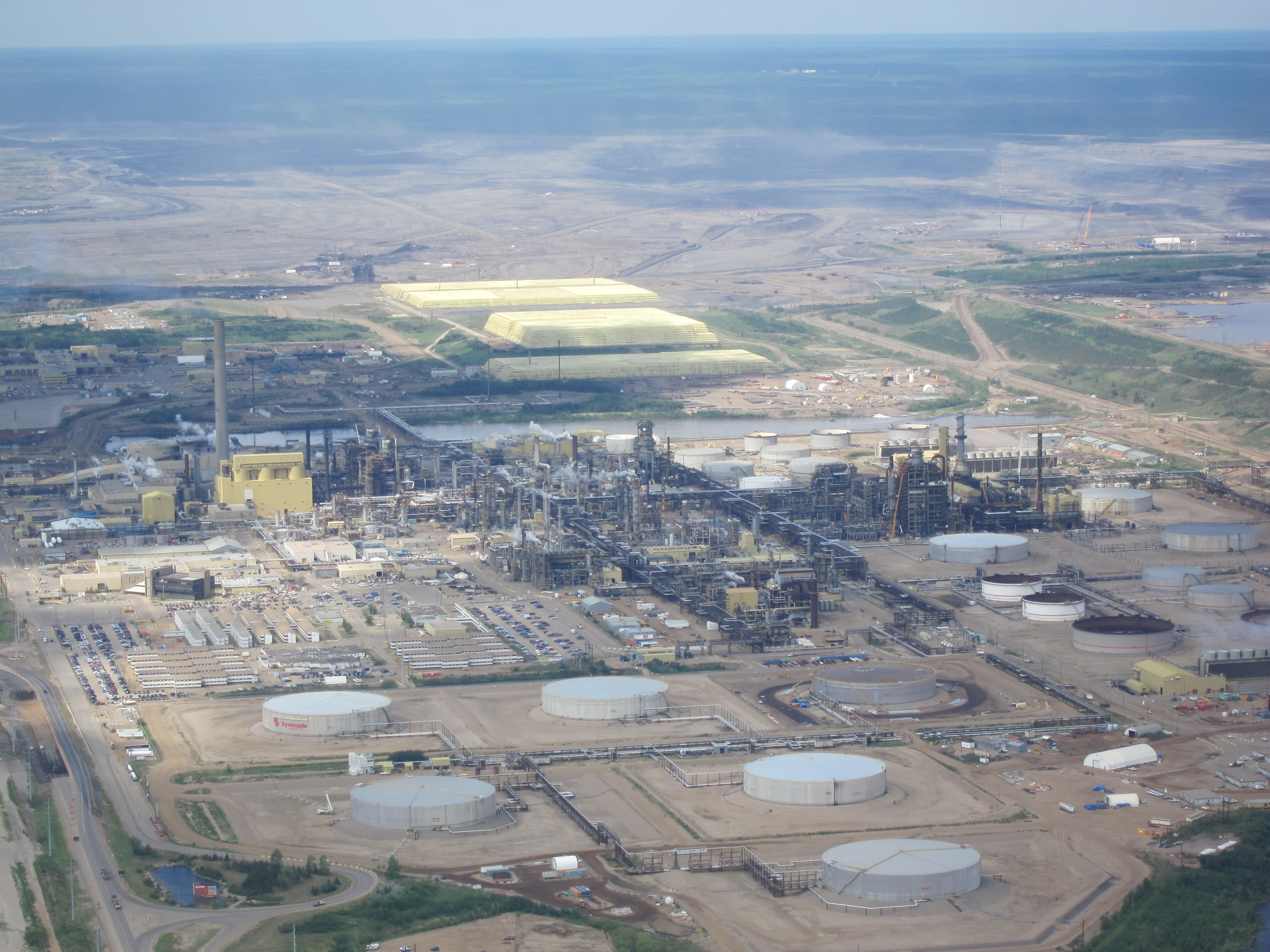
Syncrude's Mildred Lake plant (MLSB) in the Athabasca oil sands

The Alberta's oil sands "emit high levels of air pollutants" based on a May 25, 2016 article entitled "Oil sands operations as a large source of secondary organic aerosols" in Nature in June 2016 by lead author John Liggio and a team of Environment Canada scientists. Oil sands greenhouse gas emissions are the largest "anthropogenic secondary organic aerosols in North America". The Environment Canada researchers defined secondary organic aerosols (SOAs) as "gases and particles that interact with sunlight in complex ways and that are released by both the globe’s plant matter as well as fossil-burning machines and industries". According to the article in La Verge, citing Environment Canada researchers, emissions from the oil sands "equal what's produced by the entire city of Toronto". The scientists from Environment Canada said that Alberta oil sands greenhouse gas emissions may be much higher than the four main mines were reporting. For example, Suncor’s mine was 13 per cent higher than it reported, Canadian Natural Resources Ltd.'s Horizon and Jackpine mines were about 37 per cent more, and Syncrude's Mildred Lake mine (MLSB) emitted 2 1/4 times more than they reported to the federal pollutant registry.

Their "data from airborne measurements over the bitumen-producing region in August 2013 found that oilsands production generates at least 45 to 84 tonnes per day of the tiny particulate matter."

According to the University of Calgary's Joule Bergerson, a co-author of an August 31, 2018 Natural Sciences and Engineering Research Council (NSERC)-funded Science article entitled "Global carbon intensity of crude oil production", "if oil-producing countries adopted regulations similar to Canada's that limit the amount of gas flared or vented into the air, it could cut greenhouse gas emissions from oil production by almost a quarter."

==== Oil sands emissions cap ====
In May 2016, the NDP provincial government introduced the Climate Leadership Act which "included a 100-megatonne annual emissions cap on oilsands operations in Alberta". The Oil Sands Emissions Limit Act passed in December 2016. Since the Alberta's oil sands emit approximately 70-megatonne a year in 2016, the emissions cap would not negatively affect the oil industry for many years.

Without an emissions cap, however, the "federal federal government has promised that future in-situ oil projects" would have to go through approvals—not through the provincial rules under the Alberta Energy Regulator—but under the new federal regulations under development in Bill C-69, known as the "Impact Assessment Act" which will "change the regulatory process for new energy projects."

Although Premier Kenney did not approve of the NDP's 100-megatonne annual emissions cap on the oil sands, and had initially planned on eliminating the cap along with the carbon tax, within days of his winning the election, he "soften[ed] his stance." In May he said that because the "whole question of the emissions cap is academic" because [Alberta] was "nowhere close to hitting [the cap], so for us that is not a fight that we're going to get into at this point." On June 13, 2019, the federal Environment Minister Catherine McKenna announced that because of the An Act to Repeal the Carbon Tax became law in Alberta, the federal carbon tax would be imposed on Alberta as of January 1, 2020. On June 18, the Governor in Council (GIC) approved the Trans Mountain Expansion Project. The November 2016 initial federal support for the controversial expansion of the existing Trans Mountain Pipeline was conditional on Alberta having a "climate plan that included the key ingredients of a carbon tax and a cap on emissions from the oilsands". According to CBC, now that there is a forced federal carbon tax on Alberta, both of the "key conditions for the project" were fulfilled.

==== Oil sands industry's technological solutions ====
Open pit mining is used for extracting only 20% of Alberta's bitumen reserves—those that are not too deep to access. According to Vicki Lightbrown of Alberta Innovates, the remaining 80% of bitumen reserves are deep underground and can only be recovered in situ, which involves drilling down to extract the oil using methods such as Steam-assisted gravity drainage (SAGD) and Cyclic Steam Stimulation (CSS). Drilling involves "minimal land disturbance and does not require tailings ponds. Lightbrown reported that, "Greenhouse gas emissions for SAGD projects are around 0.06 tonnes of CO_{2} equivalent per barrel of bitumen produced."

=== Orphan wells ===
In the fall of 2018 Alberta's provincial government pilot project found that the "vast majority of extractive industrial [sites]", where there is no longer any productive value, and that are therefore ready for reclamation, failed to meet the standards required by law for adequate reclamation. The number of orphan wells, according to the oil industry-led Orphan Well Association's (OWA) inventory, has increased from 1,200 to over 3,700 between 2014 and 2018. (Note: An orphan well is an abandoned well site that is permanently not producing with no entity that accepts legal or financial responsibility to decommission and reclame land.) By February 2018, there were 1,800 orphan wells that had been licensed by Alberta Energy Regulator (AER) with combined liabilities of over $110 million.

=== Pipelines ===
Alberta's Western Canadian Select, one of North America's largest heavy crude oil streams, is landlocked and has faced significant obstacles to reaching tidewater. Pipeline expansions have prevented and/or delayed approvals for Trans Mountain Pipeline expansion, Enbridge Northern Gateway Pipelines, Energy East pipeline, and Keystone XL pipeline. Crude oil has been shipped by rail as an alternative.

==== Oil spills and tailings dam failures ====
On April 28, 2011, 4.5 million litres of oil (28,000 barrels) leaked from the Rainbow Pipeline, owned by the American company, Plains Midstream Canada spilled near Little Buffalo, a Lubicon Cree First Nation community in northeast of Peace River, Alberta. Alberta's Energy Resources Conservation Board (ERCB) published their report of the leak on February 26, 2013. Greenpeace sent an advanced copy of their April 24, 2013 report to the Albert Government. The report "Rainbow Pipeline Spill" was based on "confidential internal government documents". On April 24, 2013, the Environment Minister laid charges against the Plains Midstream in connection to this spill. The Energy Resources Conservation Board was dissolved in 2013.

On January 17, 2001, a rupture occurred on the Enbridge Pipeline System near Hardisty, Alberta and about 3800 cubic metres of crude oil spilled. By May 1, 2001, 3760 cubic metres of crude oil had been recovered.

In June, 2012 almost half a million litres of sour crude oil leaked into a creek that flows into the Red Deer River near Sundre, approximately 100 kilometres north of Calgary.

On June 19, 2012, an Enbridge pipeline spilled approximately 1,400 barrels of crude oil near Elk Point, Alberta.

On April 2, 2014, a pipeline spilled 70,000 litres of oil northwest of Slave Lake, Alberta.

In November, 2014 a pipeline leaked 60,000 litres of crude oil spilled into muskeg in Red Earth Creek in northern Alberta.

On March 1, 2015, in NOrthern Alberta, a pipeline leak spilled about 17,000 barrel of condensate.

On May 5, 2015, an undetermined volume of sweet natural gas and associated hydrocarbon liquid leaked onto agricultural land from a gas transmission pipeline 36 kilometres southeast of Drumheller, Alberta.

On July 15, 2015, leaked about 31,500 barrels of oil emulsion leaked from a pipeline at a Long Lake oil sands facility in northern Alberta.

On August 14, 2015, 100,000 litres of an oil, water, and gas emulsion leaked on the Hay Lake First Nation, about 100 kilometres northwest of High Level, Alberta.

On February 17, 2017, a third party struck one of Enbridge's pipelines in Strathcona County, Alberta, releasing about 200,000 litres of oil condensate. after line was struck during 3rd party construction operations. A new boat launch was created on Seba Beach, in Parkland County.

On August 3, 2005, 43 cars of a Canadian National (CN) freight train derailed near Wabamun Lake spilling up to 1.3 million litres (286,000 Imp gallons or 343,000 US gallons) of heavy bunker C fuel oil. High winds spread about 734,000 litres (161,500 Imp gal/194,000 US gal) of the oil across the lake.

On October 31, 2013, the tailings dam collapsed at the Obed Mountain coal mine, near the town of Hinton, Alberta, spilling about billion litres (260 million US gal) of wastewater into the Athabasca River. It may have been the largest coal slurry spill in Canadian history".

Eight people were killed in an explosion on a gas pipeline owned by Piggot Pipelines on January 17, 1962, about 50 kilometres northwest of Edson, Alberta.

== The electricity sector ==
As of 2008, Alberta's electricity sector was the most carbon-intensive of all Canadian provinces and territories, with total emissions of 55.9 million tonnes of CO_{2} equivalent in 2008, accounting for 47% of all Canadian emissions in the electricity and heat generation sector.

According to the National Observer, in 2016 17 per cent of Alberta's total emissions in 2016 were from the electrical sector. The oil and gas sector accounted for almost 48 per cent of the province's total carbon pollution in that year, according to federal data.

== Water resource management ==
In 2003 the province of Alberta set a strategic 10-year action plan "Water for Life: Alberta’s Strategy for Sustainability (WFL)" under then Minister of the Environment Lorne Taylor, that guides water resource management.

According to the Alberta Energy Regulator (AER), about 10 billion cubic metres (or 7 per cent) of the "140 billion cubic metres of nonsaline water available in Alberta" are "allocated for use through Water Act licenses for municipal, agricultural, forestry, industrial and other commercial us." In 2017, Of the 140 billion cubic metres of nonsaline water available in Alberta, almost 10 cent of the licensed-for-use water was for the energy industry with over 70 per cent was for oil sands mining. The rest was used in "enhanced oil recovery, hydraulic fracturing, in situ recovery operations."

=== Melting glaciers ===
From 2003 to 2010, one quarter of melting ice occurred in the Americas.

As glaciers melt and lose mass, there is less fresh water for irrigation and domestic use. Glaciers are an important part of national and provincial parks in Alberta, such as Jasper Park, and their loss effects mountain recreation, animals and plants that depend on glacier-melt. The Rocky Mountains and other mid-latitude are showing some of the largest glacial losses.

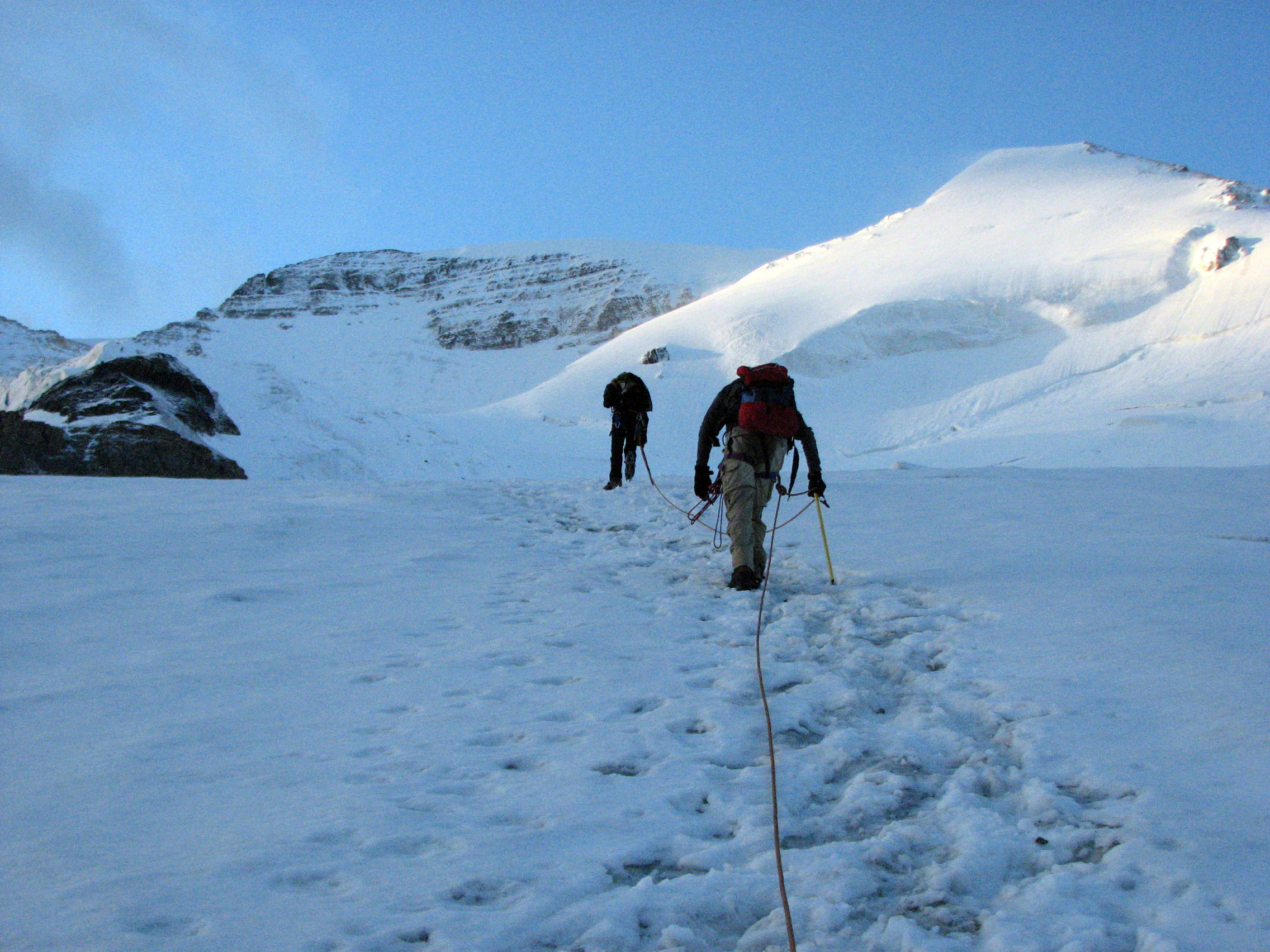
North Glacier route on Mount Athabasca

Glaciers in Canadian Rockies, such as the 325 km^{2} (125 sq mi) Columbia Icefield, of Jasper National Park, which includes one of the Icefield's outlet glaciers, Athabasca Glacier, are often larger and more widespread than in the United States Rocky Mountains. Mount Athabasca, is easily accessible. Since the late 19th century, the Athabasca Glacier has retreated 1,500 m (4,900 ft) with an increase in its rate of retreat since 1980. From 1950 to 1980 the rate of retreat had slowed. The 12 km^{2} (4.6 sq mi) Peyto Glacier retreated rapidly during the first half of the 20th century. In 1976 it stopped retreating but continued in 1976.

=== Floods and droughts ===
Alberta's Environment ministry reported in October 2009 that there was a trend of high summer temperatures and low summer precipitation in the province which has contributed to Alberta's drought conditions. which were harming the Alberta's agriculture sector, mainly in areas where there is cattle ranching area. When there is a drought there is a shortage of feed for cattle (hay, grain). With the shortage on crops ranchers are forced to purchase the feed at the increased prices while they can. For those who cannot afford to pay top money for feed are forced to sell their herds.

When Alberta experienced a severe drought in 2002, the province of Ontario was able to send a vast amount of hay to Alberta ranchers that were hit by the drought. Ontario had a good season with high hay production. Droughts like the 2002 drought creates an income deficit for many ranchers as they are forced to buy heads of cattle high and sell low.

The costliest disaster in Canadian history, according to the Insurance Bureau of Canada, was the 2013 Alberta floods which at over $1.7 billion, was more than the North American Ice Storm of 1998 at $1.6 billion.

According to the May 2019 Canada's Changing Climate Report, scientists concluded that they had "low confidence" that "anthropogenic climate change" had caused the "extreme precipitation" that resulted in the 2013 southern Alberta flood, compared to "medium confidence" that "anthropogenic climate change" had contributed to the 2016 Fort McMurray wildfire.

=== Athabasca River ===
According to an April 23, 2019 article in the PLOS One journal, Wood Buffalo National Park (WBNP), which is designated as a UNESCO World Heritage Site, is being investigated as a potential World Heritage Site in Danger because of a number of environmental stressers, including the presence of mercury (Hg). The report built on previous research that concluded that "oil sands industrial operations release mercury into the local environment" and that spring snowmelt could potentially release Hg and other chemicals into the aquatic environment of the north-flowing Athabasca River and the "Peace-Athabasca Delta and Lake Athabasca in northern Alberta".

== Wildfires ==
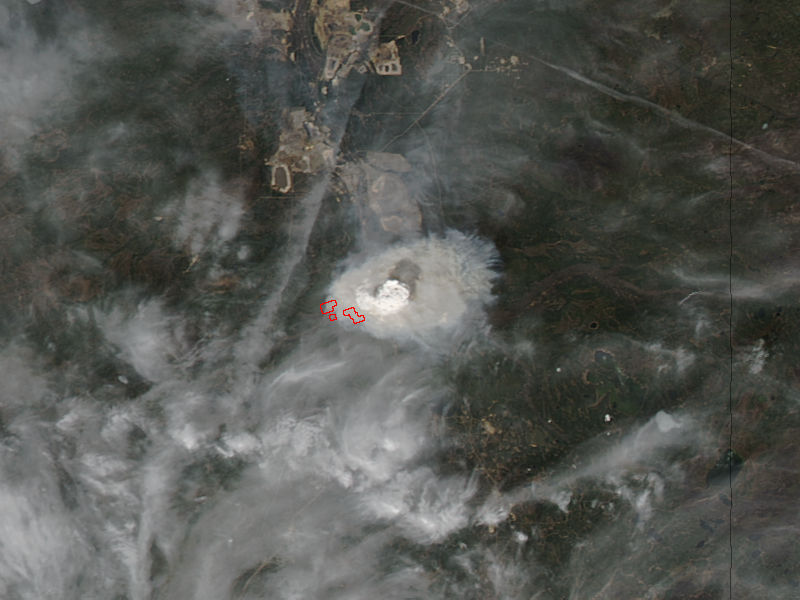
2016 Fort McMurray wildfire courtesy NASA

Canada's wildfire season, which includes Alberta, starts earlier, the frequency of wildfires has increased, and by 2016, the annual burn was twice as much as in 1970.

El Niño and global warming contributed to the 2016 Fort McMurray wildfire, which led to the evacuation of Fort McMurray at the centre of the oil sands industry.

By the afternoon of June 3, 2019, there were 558 wild fires in Alberta's Forest Protection Area with 656,842.84 hectares (1,623,094 acres) by the morning of June 3 with 595,726.23 hectares (1,472,072 acres) burned. compared to the five-year average of 590 wildfires with 136,335.82 hectares (336,893 acres) burned.

== Wilderness and parks ==
The NDP government created Bighorn Wildland Provincial Park and new Castle Park area which "when combined with existing protected areas, create the world’s largest boreal forest protected area, including key caribou habitat." In a partnership with Syncrude, the Tallcree First Nation, the Nature Conservancy of Canada (NCC), and the governments of Alberta and Canada to create new wildland provincial parks (WPP)s. The northern WPPs—Kazan, Richardson and Birch River—added about 1.36 million hectares to the Alberta's protected area network and connected Wood Buffalo National Park with WPPs. The boreal woodland caribou is a threatened species and one of the threats to its survival is habitat fragmentation of the boreal forest.

In 2026, following Canada’s commitment—alongside 195 other countries—to protect 30% of land by 2030 as part of the 30 by 30 objective, Alberta’s environment minister said the province had already exceeded that goal by counting most "multi-use Crown land"—publicly managed Crown land—as “protected,” even where activities such as forestry, oil and gas and mining were allowed, a practice environmental groups said conflicted with federal and international standards that reserved protected status for areas managed primarily for biodiversity conservation.

== Invasive species ==
=== Mountain pine beetle ===
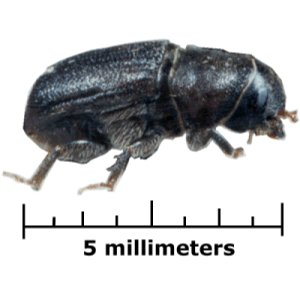
Mountain pine beetle is the most damaging insect pest of mature pines in western North America.

By 2007, Alberta Sustainable Resource Development (ASRD), reiterated that the mountain pine beetle (MPB) was the "most damaging insect pest of [mature] pine trees in western North America."

From about 2006 to 2017, Alberta spent $484 million which includes financial support from both Saskatchewan and the federal government, to fight the invasive species and "prevent damage in specific locations and to protect valuable resources, such as watersheds."

An extreme frigid cold spell in February 2019, was expected to kill off the 90 per cent of MPB's larvae in Alberta, particularly in and around Jasper National Park, where the beetle had had the most damaging effect on the forest.

In the 1940s there were outbreaks in Banff National Park and Kootenay National Park that also spread to the Kananaskis area. In the 1920s and again in the late 1950s there were outbreaks in Waterton Lakes National Park. In the 1970s and 1980s the outbreak spread into Alberta in the Castle River valley and Waterton Lakes National Park from Montana. There was a "massive unprecedented outbreak" in the early 1990s in British Columbia and in west-central Alberta.

== Species at risk ==
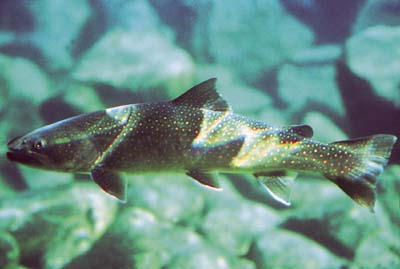
Bull trout is Alberta's Official Provincial Fish

The list of species at risk in Alberta includes the boreal woodland caribou and the bull trout—Alberta's Official Provincial Fish—which are on the IUCN Red List of Threatened Species. According to March 25, 2019, article by the Alberta Wilderness Association, the bull trout, which is popular in sport fishing, is listed as threatened and Alberta's Athabasca rainbow trout as endangered on a list of aquatic species proposed by the federal government under the Species at Risk Act (SARA). According to the Canada Gazette, the bull trout Salvelinus confluentus), are native to western Canada, is as an "indicator species of general ecosystem health". In Alberta, in particular, the bull trout range has become restricted resulting in the isolation and fragmentation of populations. According to the March 2019 federal report, "[t]he most serious threats to Bull Trout are from human disturbance, including habitat loss through degradation and fragmentation; commercial forestry; hydroelectric, oil, gas and mining development; agriculture; urbanization; road development; and climate change."

== Alberta's public policy ==
=== Climate Change Action Plan ===
Alberta released a "Climate Change Action Plan" in 2008.

=== Energy efficiency ===
Prior to 2017, Alberta was the "only jurisdiction in North America without an energy efficiency organization". In 2017, the NDP's created Energy Efficiency Alberta (EEA). It used revenues from Alberta's carbon tax to help municipalities, businesses and homeowners improve energy efficiency by funding programs and rebates. According to the NDP, in nine months in 2017, EEA saved Albertans $510 million and avoided adding "three million tonnes of GHG emissions". By May 2019, EEA—with an annual budget of $132 million—offered 20 different programs. By May 2019, Premier Jason Kenney with his Environment and Parks Minister Jason Nixon, are examining which of these programs would remain under the new UCP government. (Note: Jason Nixon was named as Environment and Parks Minister and government house leader on April 30, 2019.) EEA programs included "instant in-store savings, residential and community solar, a business energy savings program or a host of education and training grants".

In 2017, the NDP government opened the Energy Efficiency Alberta office using used "money from [Alberta'] carbon tax to fund rebates and programs aimed at increasing energy efficiency and decreasing greenhouse gas emissions."

=== Carbon pricing ===
Alberta’s climate policy has included periods with and without a stand‑alone provincial carbon tax. In 2007, the provincial government's Specified Gas Emitters Regulation (SGER), which "priced carbon from large emitters and use[d] the resulting revenue for investments in low-carbon technology", made it the "first jurisdiction in North America to have a price on carbon". The province was subject to a mix of provincial measures and the federal carbon‑pricing backstop under the 2018 Greenhouse Gas Pollution Pricing Act. By 2018, Alberta, along with five other provinces had carbon-pricing policies in place. This was short lived. By May 2019, following changes in government, Alberta, along with Manitoba, and Ontario abandoned their carbon pricing policies.

Successive provincial governments have challenged federal carbon‑pricing in court and criticized its economic impacts, while environmental groups and many economists argued that pricing emissions is a necessary tool to reduce Alberta's greenhouse gas output from sectors such as oil and gas, power generation and transportation.

Alberta has alternated between having its own carbon levy and relying on the federal backstop, reflecting deep political divisions over carbon pricing in a province with an emissions‑intensive oil and gas sector. With the 2025 election of Mark Carney as prime minister, the first act of his new administration was to end federal retail carbon pricing with a shift from climate policy toward other instruments, including regulations, subsidies and targeted industrial measures.

== Renewable energy ==
Alberta has emerged as the leading jurisdiction in Canada for renewable electricity investment by 2024. The province has made significant strides in transitioning towards renewable energy sources, such as wind and solar power, to reduce greenhouse gas emissions and promote sustainability. This shift is evident in Alberta's Renewable Electricity Act introduced and implemented by then-Premier Notley in 2015, which mandates that 30% of electricity be produced from renewable resources by 2030, showcasing a strong commitment to clean energy development. The province added 5,677 megawatts (MW) of renewable capacity onto the grid, along with investments exceeding $2.7 billion in utility-scale renewable projects that were in progress in 2024. This will increase the utility-scale renewable capacity to nearly 9,000 MW. As of October 2022, Alberta was leading in the growth of renewable energy capacity in Canada, with the addition of new wind and solar capacity. In 2023, 92% of Canada's new renewable energy generation and capacity were built in Alberta. In February 2024, Premier Danielle Smith raised concern about the growth of renewables and introduced regulations to slow it down. She suggested that "pristine viewscapes" were negatively impacted by potential wind and solar projects.

The UCP called for an inquiry into the "ongoing economic, orderly and efficient development of electricity generation in Alberta" to be undertaken by the AUC.

The March 2024 Alberta Utilities Commission report said that the Alberta's growing renewables industry posed only a minimal threat to agriculture or the environment. The report indicates that even if all renewable developments occur on some of Alberta's best land, the estimated agricultural land loss by 2041 would be less than 1%.

=== Wind power ===
Alberta purchased "thousands of megawatt hours of wind power at the lowest recorded price in Canadian history, much of it from Indigenous partnerships." Indigenous communities were also undertaking a "special solar power program for their communities".

=== Solar energy ===
In 2017, the NDP government introduced the Residential and Commercial Solar Program which encouraged the use of solar energy through a solar rebate program. The Residential and Commercial Solar Program was intended to "invest $36 million to generate 48 megawatts of electricity by 2020." By May 2019, over 1,500 residential and commercial solar projects were completed by May 2019. Nine hundred were still being developed. There were 2,200 residential projects. By May 2019, $134 million had already been invested in solar projects in Alberta. Solar energy industry has added 500 jobs with an estimated workforce in 2019 of 2,000.

With Jason Kenney as Premier, the future of Energy Efficiency Alberta and the solar rebate program, is uncertain.

=== Phasing out coal ===
Coal power generation is the most polluting source of electricity. In 2012, then-Canadian Prime Minister Stephen Harper introduced legislation that would phase out coal-fired generating units at the end-of-useful-life which is generally 50 years after the unit was first commissioned. For example, units commissioned before 1975 would be decommissioned by at least 2019. Those commissioned c. 1975 and before 1986, would be de-commissioned by the end of 2029. In 2012, Alberta had 18 coal-fired generation units. Environment Canada reported in 2012, in a backgrounder to the new legislation introduced by then-Environment Minister, Peter Kent that coal-fired generating units were "responsible for 77% of greenhouse gas (GHG) emissions from the electricity sector in Canada".

Alberta's new climate policies introduced in November 2015 also include phasing out coal-fired power plants by 2030, and cutting emissions of methane by 45% by 2025. At the time, Notley "lobbied Trudeau to allow coal-to-gas conversions as a short-term solution, extending the life of the infrastructure with fewer emissions. The carbon tax introduced by Notley's government changed the daily electricity market. All three coal-burning owners signed deals with the provincial government to "cover losses from the faster phase-out".

By April 2019, Alberta's coal industry provided 1,200 jobs. Coal phase out programs include "carbon capture and storage technology, retrofitted on existing coal plants."

== Municipalities ==
=== Edmonton ===
Edmonton passed legislation in January 2019, to launch a pilot project of the Clean Energy Improvement Program in October 2019. Edmonton is "one of the worst per-capita carbon emitters in Canada". With the change in government, Mayor Don Iveson said they were investigating ways to find partners, and to band together with other municipalities or to work with the federal government to achieve Edmonton's climate goals. By April 2019, Energy Efficiency Alberta had invested $40 million in Edmonton with the majority of the funds going to the "residential solar program and a home energy program." As part of their community energy transition strategy, the committee on ... unanimously decided to move the Energy Efficiency Alberta program forward while developing a contingency plan with the "city becoming the administrator of the program if the provincial office is slashed by the new [Kenney] government."

=== Calgary ===
Calgary began developing its Light Rail Transit (LRT) systems in 1979. By November 2016, Calgary's LRT was "one of the largest and well used public transit systems in North America". By 2016 Calgary had added the Bus Rapid Transit (BRT) lines and had begun working on the Green Line. The Green Line was to be partially funded with " $1.53 billion over eight years" from the carbon levy. (Note: According to an April 8, 2019 CBC News article, by March 6, 2019, the provincial government estimated that the carbon tax "would generate $2.6 billion by ...the end of March." The Climate Change and Emissions Management Fund (CCEMF), which is a separate system of carbon pricing for large-scale industrial emitters" and was put in place in 2009 has brought in $899 million.)

== See also ==
- Environmental issues in Canada
- Environmental impact of the Athabasca oil sands
- Hard Choices: Climate Change in Canada (2004 book)
- Regional effects of global warming
- 2012 North American drought
- Summer 2012 North American heat wave
- List of articles about Canadian tar sands
- 2011 Little Buffalo oil spill
- Enbridge Pipeline System
- Mountain pine beetle
- Obed Mountain coal mine spill
- Oil sands tailings ponds
- Orphan wells (Alberta)
- Seba Beach
- Wabamun Lake
