= Coal refuse =

Waste from coal mining

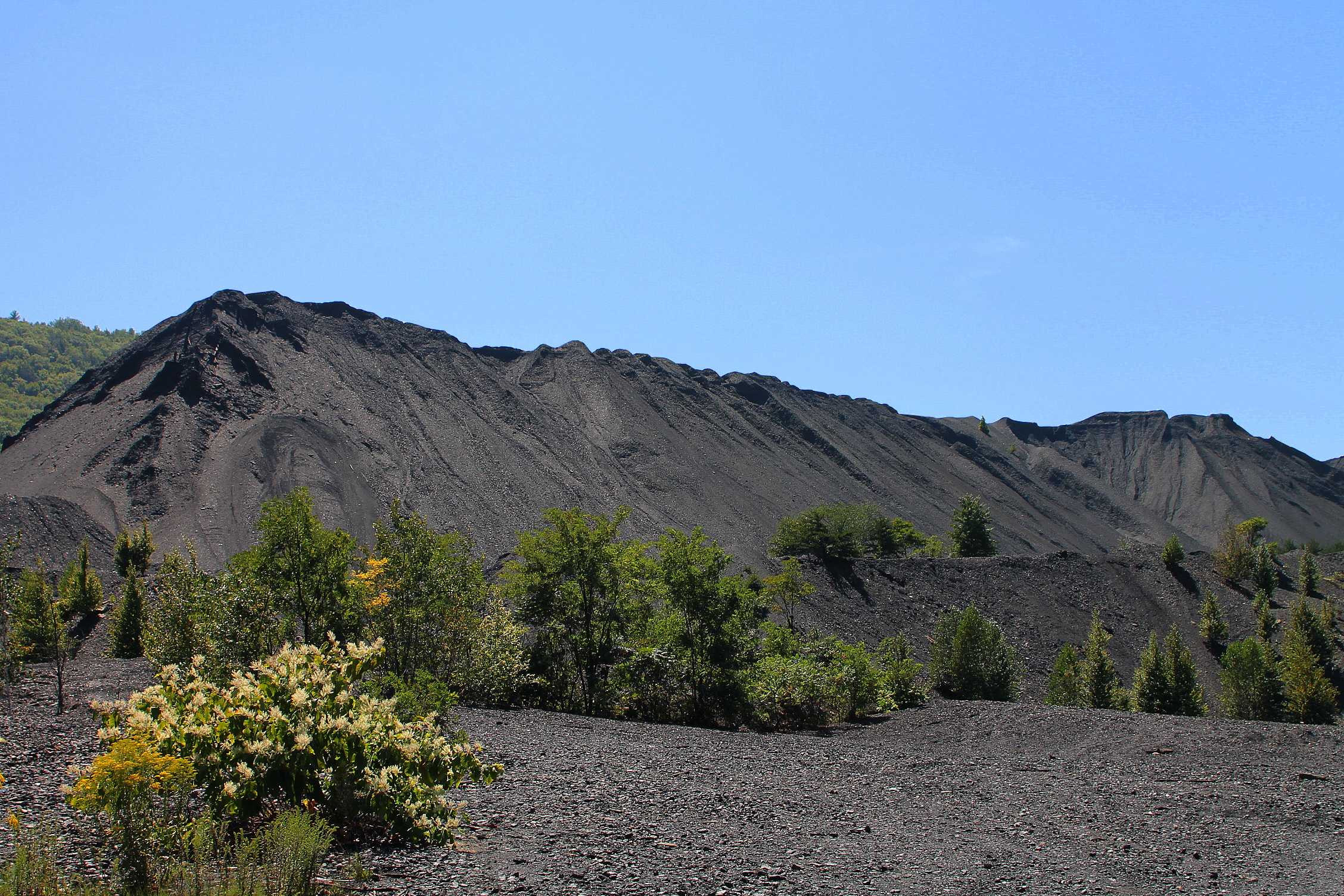
Coal waste in Pennsylvania

Coal refuse, also known as coal waste, rock, slag, coal tailings, waste material, rock bank, culm, boney, or gob, is the material left over from coal mining, usually as tailings piles or spoil tips. For every tonne of hard coal generated by mining, 400 kg (880 lb) of waste material remains, which includes some lost coal that is partially economically recoverable. Coal refuse is distinct from the byproducts of burning coal, such as fly ash.

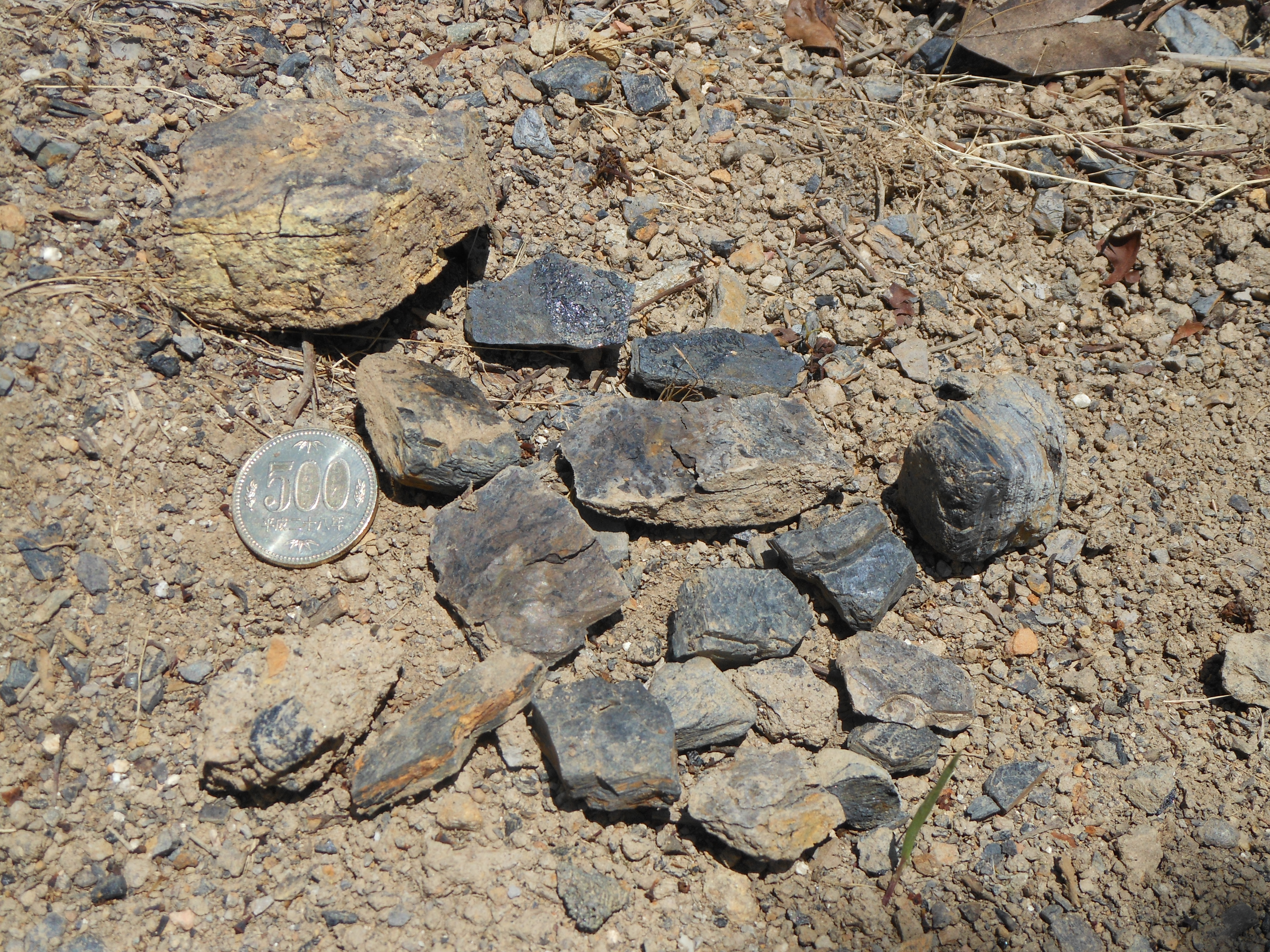
Coal spoil stones

Piles of coal refuse can have significant negative environmental consequences, including the leaching of iron, manganese, and aluminum residues into waterways and acid mine drainage. The runoff can create both surface and groundwater contamination. The piles also create a fire hazard, with the potential to spontaneously ignite. Because most coal refuse harbors toxic components, it is not easily reclaimed by replanting with plants like beach grasses.

Gob has about four times as much toxic mercury and more sulfur than typical coal. Culm is the term for waste anthracite coal.

== Disposal ==
The first step to reclaiming land occupied by coal refuse piles is to remove the refuse matter.

=== As fuel ===
Where economically viable, some coal miners try to reprocess these wastes. This may include complex reprocessing in more industrialized economies, such as fluidized bed combustion in power plants. In less industrialized systems, manual sorting may be employed. For example, in the Jharia coalfield in eastern India, a large cohort of "coal cycle wallahs" manually sort mine tailings with their families, and then transport the salvaged coal on bicycles more than 60 km (37 mi) to market.

==== Handling of combustion products ====
The burning of waste coal typically produces more environmental toxins than higher energy coals. Modern fluidized bed combustion with limestone for acid gas control can lower toxin emissions to acceptable levels, (Note: Burning of waste coal also produces more CO_{2} than higher-grade coals. Current (2013) technology does not usefully mitigate this difference.) concentrating the toxicity into waste ash. For every 100 tons of coal waste burned, 85 tons of waste ash (more toxic versions of fly ash and bottom ash) are created. However, this ash is more stable than the waste and may simply be re-compacted into the mine site with less risk of leaching. It can also be used to neutralize acidic mine discharge.

The waste ash from burning coal waste was approved as a source of fly ash by the West Virginia Department of Highways in 2019.

=== Other uses ===
There have been some attempts to use non-flammable coal waste in concrete production, similar to the use of fly ash.

== By geography ==
=== United States ===
In the United States, most waste coal piles accumulated from 1900 to 1970 when processing techniques were less sophisticated. The US has a longstanding inspection program of these refuse piles. In Pennsylvania alone, there are over 770 such piles identified. There are at least 18 coal waste burning plants in the United States, mostly in Pennsylvania.

The Grant Town Power Project in West Virginia burns 530,000 tons of coal refuse annually, allowing the reclamation of 30 acres of land annually. Still, there's criticism regarding the plant's negative profitability and its greenhouse gas emissions from burning coal. The plant has controversially proposed pivoting to cryptocurrency mining for funding. Wider replacement of cement by its fly ash should bring down its carbon footprint.

== Etymology ==
The word gob or goaf referring to coal waste is of uncertain origin but goes back over 200 years, long before a false etymology as a backronym for "garbage of bituminous" was humorously invented to "explain" it.

== Disasters ==
In the 1966 Aberfan disaster in Wales, a colliery spoil tip collapsed, engulfing a school and killing 116 children and 28 adults. Other accidents involving coal waste include the Martin County coal slurry spill (US, 2000), the Kingston Fossil Plant coal fly ash slurry spill (US, 2008), and the Obed Mountain coal mine spill (Canada, 2013).
