= Tar Sands Healing Walk =

Demonstration to help bring awareness of impact of the Athabasca Oil Sands

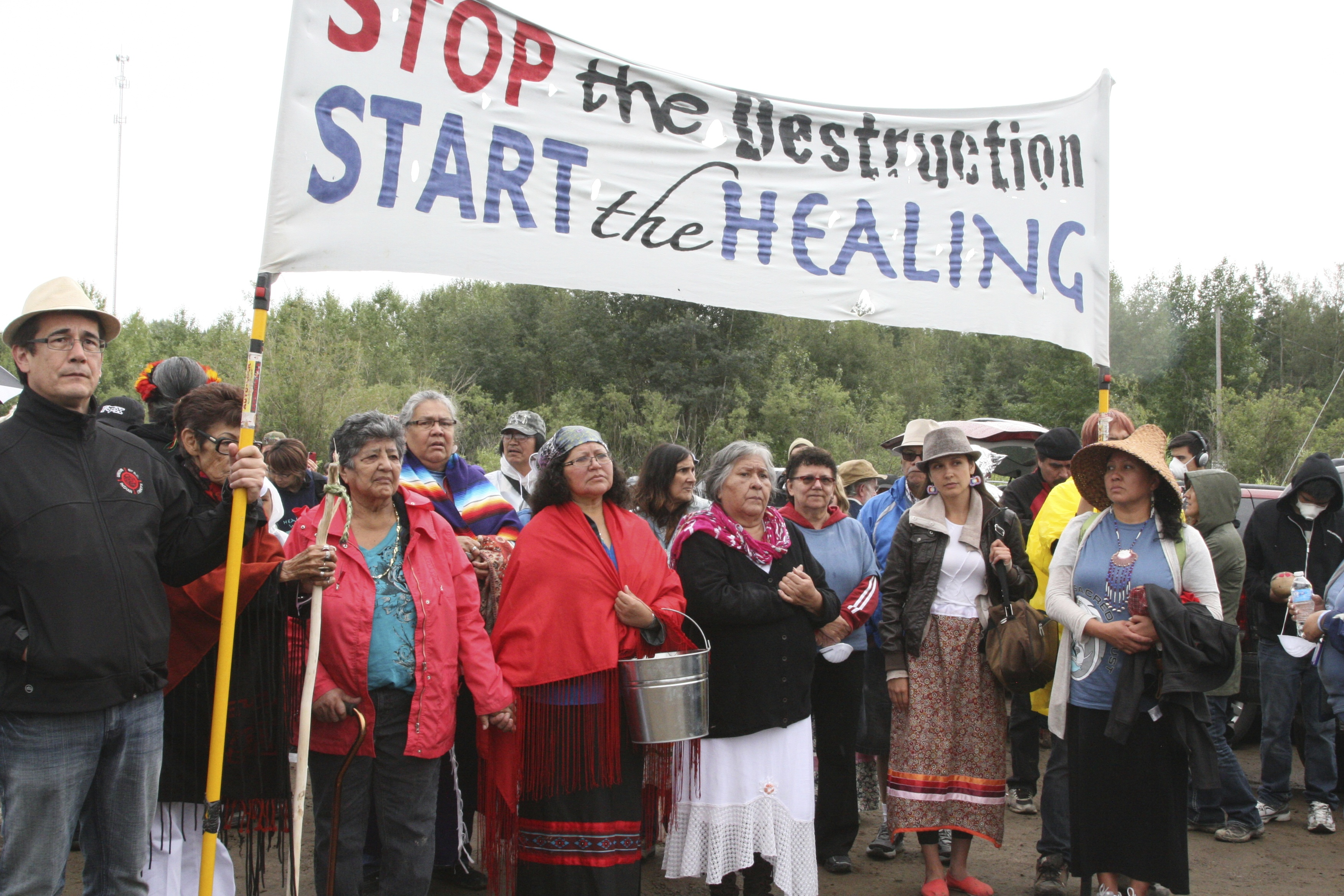
- 2013 participants
- Genre: Grassroots demonstration
- Begins: August 14, 2010
- Ends: June 28, 2014
- Frequency: Annual
- Locations: Fort McMurray, Alberta, Canada
- Founders: Eriel Deranger, Melina Laboucan-Massimo, Cleo Reece
- Participants: First Nations, Métis, Inuit, various environmental groups, and citizens of the Athabasca River watershed

The Tar Sands Healing Walk was a 14 km annual prayer walk in demonstration against crude oil extraction in the Athabasca tar sands. It began in 2010, starting just north of the city of Fort McMurray, Alberta at a location known as the Syncrude Loop, and traveling through the heart of the tar sands extraction zone. The walk was led by local Indigenous Elders, who prayed for the healing of the land and to bring attention to the destructive impacts of the tar sands.

The Tar Sands Healing Walk was founded by a coalition of Indigenous women from First Nations communities impacted by Tar Sands projects, and included Cleo Reece (Fort McMurray First Nation), Eriel Tchekwie Deranger (Athabasca Chipewyan First Nation) and Melina Laboucan-Massimo (Little Buffalo First Nation). It was supported by environmental organizations Greenpeace, Sierra Club Prairie Chapter, and Keepers of the Athabasca. The last walk took place in 2014, as the organizers felt their goals of spreading awareness were achieved.

== Background ==
The inaugural gatherings was organized by local communities and supported by allies. The following years, Keepers of the Athabasca, a collective of First Nations, Metis, Inuit, environmental groups and watershed citizens, became a core supporter. Jesse Cardinal of the Kikino Metis Settlement was hired to support the main founders and organizer to coordinate the annual event, which ultimately expanded to include an educational and spiritual camp before and after, including conference and ceremony. Over five consecutive years, the Tar Sands Healing Walk brought together hundreds of people to walk in a spiritual gathering to protect culture, environment and climate from the expansion of the tar sands.

The prayer walk aimed to bring awareness to the impact of the tar sands development. "Protests, rallies, marches are all good and necessary, but we felt like people needed something more spiritual, something to strengthen a connection to the land", said organizer Jesse Cardinal. It was a reaction to the alleged legislative abuses of indigenous treaty rights.

Hundreds of people traveled from all over North America and beyond to participate. The walk took place on the territories of the Cree, Dene and Métis peoples of northern Alberta, where the impacts of tar sands extraction on the land and its inhabitants were significant.

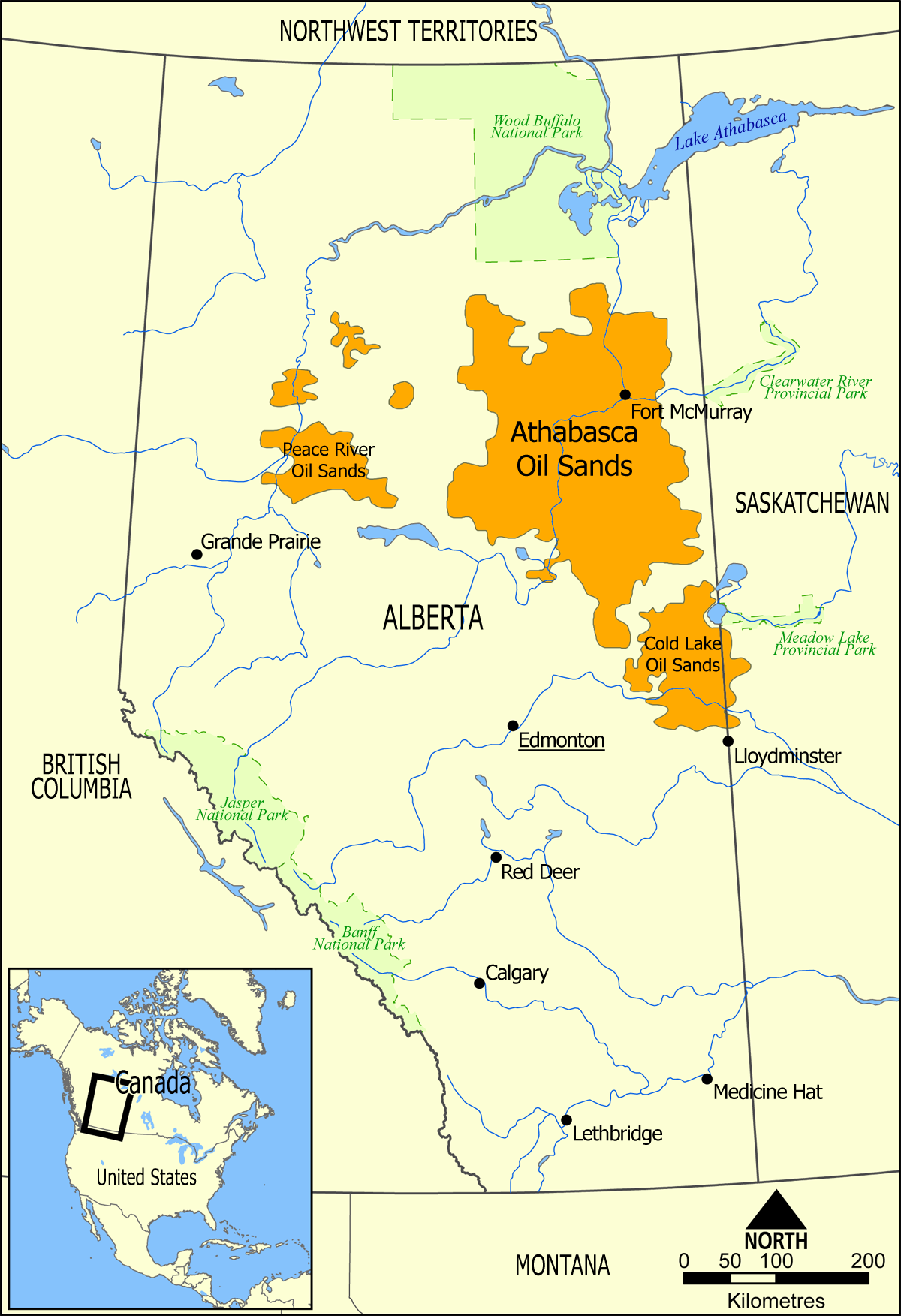
Athabasca Oil Sands

Many people gathered and camped at the Indian Beach Campsite in Anzac, just outside Fort McMurray near the Athabasca Oil Sands, to participate in the walk. Native elders from all over North America led people past lakes of tailings, wastewater, and infrastructure of the tar sands industry along the Athabasca River, covering a walking route ranging from 14 to 16 kilometers. The 2014 walk was the last official walk. "This is the last healing walk in the Athabasca region because it's time to shed light on other communities impacted by tar sands," said Jesse Cardinal, coordinator of Keepers of the Athabasca. "In order to stop the destruction, the healing has to start everywhere."

== Main issues ==
The walk brought awareness to Canadian human rights violations and the devastating impacts of the Athabasca Oil Sands on First Nations people. The local rights to clean air and clean water were outlined in the historical Treaty 8 and Treaty 6, both protected by the Canadian Constitution, section 35. Under the local Treaty agreements, Indigenous peoples are guaranteed the right to hunt, trap and fish on their traditional lands in perpetuity. The oil sands developments threaten local Indigenous peoples' traditional way of life by destroying the very habitat upon which the animals and fish depend.

The Canadian oil sands, also known as the tar sands, is the largest industrial project on earth, yet few Canadians are aware of the rapid pace of growth and its impacts on the environment, economy, and society. Alberta tar sands produced approximately 1.9 million barrels of oil per day in 2012. If industry and government’s expansion plans are approved this number could reach 5 million barrels per day by the end of 2030. In 2013, First Nations people witnessed the oil spill in Cold Lake, which still continues to pose problems for people in the area. Eight experts in environmental science, policy and risk from Simon Fraser University called for a moratorium on all new tar sands development until there is a comprehensive policy-making process for more sustainable energy development for North America.

== Health of indigenous people ==
Since 2007 higher than normal incidences of rare and deadly cancers and brain tumours have been documented by the Alberta Health Department in First Nations communities that live downstream of the oil sands. Arsenic, cancer causing carcinogens, are created by bitumen production. Arsenic deposits are detected in water, soil, and even in the remnants of fallen snow that have been tested in the area.

Toxins are inescapable and cancer rates are skyrocketing, especially among women and children, due to the industrial chemical exposure in the water and the air. These chemicals are now inextricable from the landscape. This health issue for indigenous people is considered a form of industrial genocide.

Cancers and asthma rates for people of Northern Alberta are higher than most places in Canada and higher than non-indigenous people. Life expectancy for indigenous people is on average five years less than non-indigenous people.

Under the current oil sands development, woodland caribou populations are expected to disappear. This poses a problem for the hunting traditions of Indigenous peoples in Canada. This threatens their food security and adds to overall health issues for the people and the environment.

=== Women ===
In Solidarity with the Healing Walk: Women's voices on the oil sands, pipelines, and climate change, discusses issues on climate change and health for indigenous women and children. Very few sources discuss these issues from the perspective of women. Women's voices are silenced in politics especially in indigenous politics. Their families are more impacted by rare cancers and their children are suffering higher rates of asthma than non-indigenous children who live outside the path of environmental impact.

Founder and organizer Eriel Tchekwie Deranger is explicit that what is happening in her community is industrial genocide, and that her community and its traditional way of life are dying along with her people. Indigenous women are very impacted, not just by tar sands, but through this representation of continued colonization.

== Human rights ==
In a human rights report on Canada, Amnesty International suggested that the government should have respect for indigenous rights when issuing licenses for mining, logging, petroleum and other resource extraction. The tar sands boom is an attack on First Nations rights, by displacing indigenous populations and dismantling crucial environmental protections. The Beaver Lake Cree nation has documented 20,000 treaty rights violations linked to tar sands expansion. 80% of the traditional territories of the Athabasca Chipewyan, First Nation and the Cree First Nation are rendered inaccessible for periods of the year due to oil sands development. The land that is accessible is devastated by development.

== Health of the environment ==
Climate activist Bill McKibben notes that if development in Canada's oil sands continue, it will cause irreversible damage to the planet. Despite the economic advantages that developing oil could have on Canada, McKibben suggested that it's time to develop green energy jobs.

Oil sands underlie approximately 140,000 square kilometers of Alberta – an area about the size of Florida. Oil sands leases cover about 20% of the province’s land area. In 46 years of development, only 0.15% of the environment disturbed is certified as "reclaimed." There is no way to return the boreal forest to its natural state. Over 30 million birds will be lost over the next 20 years due to tar sands development.

=== Climate ===
Greenhouse gas emissions are produced by Canada's tar sand that impact the global climate. The exploitation of the oil sands is the primary reason Canada will fail to meet its own greenhouse gas reduction targets. Canada’s climate performance is the worst in the entire Western world. More than 600 million cubic feet of natural gas are used every day to extract oil from the tar sands. That amount of gas is enough to heat more than 3 million Canadian homes every day. The International Energy Agency reports that increasing oil production from 1.9 million barrels to 5 million a day will lead to a catastrophic increase in the global temperature. Carbon emissions from the production and processing of the oil sands have more than doubled in the last decade and are on track to double again. The Canadian government has mounted an intensive lobbying campaign to weaken clean fuel standards that the European Commission has proposed to achieve its climate change targets.

=== Air and water ===
In northern Alberta, local Aboriginal communities are forced to endure highly degraded air and water quality. Oil sands industry used approximately 170 million cubic metres of water in 2011 to extract bitumen. That is the equivalent to the residential water use of 1.7 million Canadians. 95% of the water used in tar sands surface mining is so polluted it has to be stored in toxic sludge pits. That is 206,000 litres of toxic waste discharged every day.

"The river used to be blue. Now it’s brown. Nobody can fish or drink from it. The air is bad. This has all happened so fast," says Elsie Fabian, 63, an elder in a Native Indian community along the Athabasca River.

Canada is home to two of the three largest dams in the world. They are used to hold back toxic sludge from the oil sands. 11 million litres of toxic wastewater seep out of the tailing pits into the boreal forest and Athabasca river every day. That is 4 billion litres a year. Air pollutant guidelines in Alberta are less stringent than international standards. Despite that, air quality objectives were exceeded 1,556 times in 2009, up from 47 times in 2004.

David Schindler, environmental scientist, conducted research to assess the way water pollution was investigated in the oil sands. His research indicated that water monitoring was only regulated by the industry, not outside environmental consultants. This led to inaccurate levels of carcinogens reported over time. Chief Allan Adams of the Athabasca area is consulting with Schindler to provide evidence of water pollution linked to the seepage from the tailings ponds.

=== Land and species ===
Eighty per cent of the traditional territory of the Mikisew Cree and Athabasca Chipewyan First Nations has been rendered inaccessible for most of the year by tar sands development, which is a violation of treaty rights. This directly impacts fishing and hunting access.

If we don’t have land and we don’t have anywhere to carry out our traditional lifestyles, we lose who we are as a people. So, if there’s no land, then it’s equivalent in our estimation to genocide of a people," says George Poitras of the Mikisew Cree First Nation.

Hunting is a traditional way of life for Indigenous peoples in Canada. The loss of habitat has prevented hunting on their own land. The pollutants from the production of the oil sands iskilling animals and fish that First Nations communities relied on at one time for food. In 2007, it was suggested that wildlife has been negatively affected by the oil sands; for instance, moose were found in a 2006 study to have as high as 453 times the acceptable levels of arsenic in their systems, though later studies lowered this to 17 to 33 times the acceptable level (although below international thresholds for consumption).

== See also ==
- Fort Chipewyan
