= Peder Paus =

Peder Paus may refer to:

- Peder Paus (provost) (1590–1653), Norwegian high-ranking cleric who served as the provost of Upper Telemark from 1633 until his death
- Peder Paus (businessman) (born 1945), Norwegian entrepreneur, banker and investor
