= Questerre Energy =

Questerre Energy Corporation
- Company type: Publicly traded corporation
- Traded as: TSX: QEC; OSE: QEC
- Industry: Petroleum industry
- Founded: 2000
- Headquarters: Calgary, Canada (Headquarters) Oslo, Norway (Office)
- Area served: Worldwide
- Key people: Peder Paus founder Michael Binnion founder and CEO
- Products: Shale gas exploration
- Revenue: C$10.4 million (2010)
- Operating income: ▼ (C$18.3 million) (2010)
- Net income: ▼ (C$15.7 million) (2010)
- Total assets: C$269.0 million (end 2010)
- Total equity: C$248.9 million (end 2010)
- Number of employees: 20 (end 2010)
- Website: www.questerre.com

Questerre Energy Corporation (QEC) is an international energy exploration company headquartered in Calgary, Canada, and listed on the Toronto Stock Exchange and the Oslo Stock Exchange. It holds the largest acreage position in the Utica Shale in the Saint Lawrence Lowlands. Questerre also have operations in Saskatchewan and in the Montney Formation in Alberta.

== Background ==
Questerre is involved in the oil shale operations through its equity investment in Red Leaf Resources, an owner of proprietary EcoShale In-Capsule Technology for shale oil extraction and leases in Utah and Wyoming.

The company was co-founded in 2000 by the Norwegian businessman Peder Paus and the Canadian businessman Michael Binnion. The largest shareholder for many years was Peder Paus, the company's Chairman until 2015. Binnion has served as CEO since the company's establishment, becoming its largest shareholder.

The company is included on the OBX Index since December 2017. It was also included on the index between June 2010 and December 2011. Shares closed at USD$0.0701 on May 28, 2020.

In their January 2019 Corporate report, QES listed its Canadian assets in Western Alberta, Southeastern Saskatchewan and Southwestern Manitoba, and in Quebec's Saint Lawrence Lowlands. Other assets include shale oil in Utah and in the Kingdom of Jordan. Market capitalization as of January 11, 2019 totaled $126 million.

== Management and Board ==
Peder Paus is a co-founder with Michael Binnion, who is QEC's President & Chief Executive Officer. Other board members include Bjorn Inge Tonnessen, Alain Sans Cartier, Hans Jacob Holden, Earl Hickok, and Dennis Sykora. Managers include John Brodylo, Peter Coldham, Jason D’Silva, and Rick Tityk.

== Assets ==
Questerre continued to acquire land for development of the Utica Shale gas deposit in Quebec's Saint Lawrence Lowlands but was unable to access regulatory permits from the previous and the current Quebec premiers. To encourage local communities to support local natural gas development, In the December 19, 2018 Boe report, Binnion said that QEC would follow Quebec Oil & Gas Association's "best practice of 3% profit sharing with local communities".

=== Advocacy ===
Modern Miracle Network (MMN), is an advocacy organization that was incorporated in 2016 by Michael Binnion and operates out of Questerre Energy's offices. Other MMN board members includes two Questerre Energy staff members other Calgary oil and gas activists, including Painted Pony Energy's Patrick Ward, Perpetual Energy's Susan Riddell Rose and Tourmaline Oil's Mike Rose. Binnion is chair of the Manning Foundation and a member of the board of governors Canadian Association of Petroleum Producers (CAPP).
