= Alberta Wilderness Association =

Canadian provincial wilderness protection group

- Established: 1965
- Key people: Debborah Donnelly (Executive Director)
- Location: Calgary, Canada
- Website: albertawilderness.ca

Alberta Wilderness Association (AWA) is a Calgary, Alberta-based province-wide non-profit, charitable organization established in 1965 in Lundbreck, Alberta, devoted to protecting the province's wilderness. By 2025, AWA had over 10,000 members and supporters.

== Background ==
When the Alberta Wilderness Association, was formed in 1965 in southwestern rural Alberta, it was the first wilderness conservation group in the province that was dedicated to conserving and protecting Alberta's wilderness. By 1965, a small group of back-country enthusiasts—including Floyd and Karen Stromstedt, Marian and Bill Michalsky, and Steve and Helen Dixon—raised concerns in meetings with "local farmers, teachers and community leaders", that Alberta's official "multiple-use" land policy, was "destroying, not preserving" Alberta's "public land wild spaces". In Lundbreck, Alberta in 1965, thirty-four people officially formed the Alberta Wilderness Association when William (Willie) Michalsky, a "local outfitter and rancher" was elected as the Association's first president.

In the 1960s, Stromstedt would hunt sheep hunter in the Foothills. He had become concerned by the "growing encroachment of industrialization" in the wilderness. Bill Michalsky and Steve Dixon shared his concerns. In an April 1971 letter, Stromstedt described how the AWA had attracted 900 members—"some who love horses, some who hate horses; some who hunt, some who hate hunters; some who fish, some who do not fish; some who backpack, some who prefer day hikes; some who paint pictures, some who take photographs; some lone wolves, some with five children; some church leaders, some Girl Guides; some ranchers, some urbanites; and on and on, ad infinitum."

The AWA publishes the quarterly journal, Wild Lands Advocate.

== Supporters ==
By 2020, AWA had over 7,000 supporters including Calgary Hitmen Hockey Club, Heritage Park Historical Village, Royal Tyrrell Museum, Telus Spark, the Calgary Flames, Calgary Zoo, and Government of Alberta Culture and Tourism. By 2025, the number of supporters had increased to over 10,000.

== Advocacy and research ==
The AWA monitors and advocates for the protection of species at risk in Alberta, including aquatic species that are listed under the federal government's Species at Risk Act (SARA), such as the threatened bull trout—popular in sport fishing in Alberta and Alberta's Athabasca rainbow trout, which is on SARA's proposed list of endangered aquatic species.

In January 2019, the AWA joined with the David Suzuki Foundation, and Athabasca Chipewyan First Nation to file an application for an emergency protection order for five caribou herds in northeastern Alberta. The application made by Ecojustice, on their behalf, was based on the federal Species At Risk Act and on two federal studies by the federal government, that found that "critical habitat for boreal caribou was not being adequately protected in any province." Ecojustice discontinued the case when the federal government announced its new protection plan.

In an October 23, 2020 interview with APTN National News, AWA's Ian Urquhart warned Benga Mining Limited's proposed Grassy Mountain Coal Project, a 2,800-hectare mountain top removal open-pit metallurgical coal mine near Crowsnest Pass, would "decapitate Grassy Mountain".

In April 2023, AWA submitted a request asking the Alberta Energy Regulator (AER) to reconsider approvals given to Suncor Energy in September 2022, to expand its existing Fort Hills oil sands mine into the McClelland Lake wetland complex (MLWC)—a (patterned fen) wetland that has the potential for storing from 8 to 35 million tonnes equivalence of carbon dioxide, according to a Canadian Press article. In November, AER denied the AWA's request.

In August 2023, AWA submitted a Statement of Concern to the Alberta Energy Regulator (AER) regarding Summit Coal Inc.'s application for the purposes of coal mining at their Mine 14 site, located approximately 3.2 km northeast of Grande Cache. In December 2024, AWA requested to participate in the AER's public hearing on applications submitted by Summit Coal Inc. for the Mine 14 Underground Coal Mine Project, and was granted full-participation status in February 2025. The hearing was expected to take place in October 2025. However, the CEO of AER, Rob Morgan, cancelled the public hearing at the request of the coal company on August 21, 2025.

== Charity Intelligence ranking ==
In 2020, the AWA was included on Charity Intelligence Canada's list of the 2020 Top 100 Rated Charities in Canada with an A rating. They have maintained this rating and in 2024, AWA is still a Top 100 Rated Charity.

== See also ==
- List of advocacy groups in Canada
