= Modern Miracle Network =

Canadian fossil fuel advocacy group

- Motto: Celebrating the modern miracle of hydrocarbons
- Founder: Michael Binnion
- Established: 2016
- President: Michael Binnion
- Slogan: "Celebrating the modern miracle of hydrocarbons" "Life is better with Canadian hydrocarbons!"
- Location: Calgary, Canada
- Website: Official website

Modern Miracle Network (MMN) is a Canadian fossil fuel advocacy organization that was incorporated in 2016 by entrepreneur Michael Binnion, and operates out of the offices of Calgary, Alberta-based Questerre Energy. Binnion is chair of the Manning Foundation and a member of the board of governors of the Canadian Association of Petroleum Producers (CAPP).

== Overview ==
According to The Globe and Mail, Modern Miracle Network (MMN) hosted a "highly political" private event to "map out strategy for ousting Justin Trudeau's Liberals" in the 2019 Canadian federal election. Journalist John Lornic described the organization as an "astroturf advocacy operation with a curiously anachronistic handle" that has hosted an event with "energy industry operatives, senior Conservative advisors and then Conservative leader Andrew Scheer to win the 2019 Canadian federal election. DeSmogBlog calls the MMN, a "Canadian pro-oil advocacy group". Michael Binnion and Vivian Krause were among the speakers at the 2019 Indigenous Energy Summit.

Michael Binnion also wrote a column in the Toronto Sun ahead of the conversation between President Joe Biden and Prime Minister Justin Trudeau, following the President's inauguration and cancellation of the Keystone XL pipeline, promoting the steps the Canadian Oil and Gas Industry has committed to, and create a conversation around Canada's energy independence.

== Administration ==
Modern Miracle Network was incorporated by Michael Binnion in 2016. Binnion is chair of the Manning Foundation and a member of the board of governors Canadian Association of Petroleum Producers (CAPP).

Board members include representatives from energy and oil companies.

== Publications ==
MMN funded the publication of Moment of truth: how to think about Alberta's future co-edited by economist Jack Mintz, Ted Morton, and Tom Flanagan. Both Morton and Flanagan had co-signed the 2001 "Firewall Letter"—also known as the Alberta Agenda—in which they called for Alberta to create a protective firewall around the province of Alberta to "limit the extent to which an aggressive and hostile federal government can encroach on legitimate provincial jurisdiction." They called on then Alberta premier Ralph Klein to withdraw from the Canada Pension Plan, replace the Royal Canadian Mounted Police (RCMP), take over health care decision-making, and collect income tax in order to "limit the extent to which an aggressive and hostile federal government can encroach on legitimate provincial jurisdiction." The book echoes the firewall message, which is restated in Premier Jason Kenney's 2019 Fair Deal Panel report.

Following the inauguration of President Joe Biden and the cancellation of the Keystone XL pipeline the MMN wrote briefing notes that were published in the Toronto Sun. In this publication it should be noted the MMN mission is "...to promote serious, respectful and non-partisan conversations about energy", and when speaking about the Canadian Oil and Gas industry "...our industry is committed to a net zero by 2050".
