= Eriel Deranger =

Indigenous climate activist; executive director of Indigenous Climate Action

- Born: Eriel Tchekwie Deranger; 1979 (age 46–47)
- Occupations: Indigenous rights and climate change activist
- Employer: Indigenous Climate Action

Eriel Tchekwie Deranger (born 1979) is a Dënesųłiné indigenous rights activist and climate activist. She is executive director of Indigenous Climate Action.

== Career ==
Deranger worked as communications coordinator for the Athabasca Chipewyan First Nation beginning in 2011. She has also worked for Rainforest Action Network and Sierra Club Canada. Her work and activism has focused on the recognition of the sovereignty of the indigenous people of the Treaty 8 area of Canada.

Deranger organized activism and indigenous protests against the expansion of the Athabasca oil sands in Alberta, Canada. She was a founder of the Tar Sands Healing Walk, an annual ceremony from 2010-2014.

In 2015, Deranger was one of several cofounders of Indigenous Climate Action, an indigenous-led organization that argues that Indigenous rights and knowledge are a necessary part of addressing climate change and achieving climate justice. The organization also developed resources for indigenous communities facing the effects of climate change.

In 2017, Deranger became executive director of Indigenous Climate Action.

== Personal life ==
Deranger was born in 1979 and is Dënesųłiné and a member of the Athabasca Chipewyan First Nation. Deranger's parents were members of the American Indian Movement who met at the Wounded Knee Occupation.

Deranger is married and has two children.

== In media ==
Deranger was one of three activists profiled in the 2012 documentary Elemental, which depicts her opposition to the Keystone Pipeline.

== Selected publications ==
- Deranger, Eriel. Climate Emergency & the Colonial Response. Yellowhead Institute, 2 July 2021.
- Deranger, Eriel Tchekwie. The Green New Deal In Canada: Challenges For Indigenous Participation. Yellowhead Institute, 15 July 2019.
- Deranger, Eriel. I feel betrayed by the government and a system that has destroyed the spirit of my people. Canada's National Observer, 24 April 2018.
- Deranger, Eriel. The fight against tar sands is about more than the environment. Red Pepper, 25 October 2015.
