= Elemental (2012 film) =

- Directed by: Emmanuel Vaughan-Lee; Gayatri Roshan
- Produced by: Emmanuel Vaughan-Lee; Gayatri Roshan
- Cinematography: Emily Topper
- Edited by: Pedro Kos
- Music by: H. Scott Salinas; Emmanuel Vaughan-Lee
- Production company: Go Project Films
- Release date: October 9, 2012 (MIFF)
- Running time: 93 minutes
- Country: United States
- Languages: English; Hindi

Elemental is a 2012 American documentary film directed by Emmanuel Vaughan-Lee and Gayatri Roshan. The film was premiered at the Mill Valley Film Festival on October 9, 2012, in Mill Valley, California.

== Synopsis ==
Elemental tells the story of three individuals united by their deep connection with nature and driven to confront some of the most pressing ecological challenges of our time.

The film follows Rajendra Singh, an Indian government official gone rogue, on a 40-day pilgrimage down India's once pristine Ganges river, now polluted and dying. Facing community opposition and personal doubts, Singh works to shut down factories, halt construction of dams, and rouse the Indian public to treat their sacred "Mother Ganga" with respect.

Across the globe in northern Canada, Eriel Deranger mounts her own "David and Goliath" struggle against the world's largest industrial development, the Tar Sands, an oil deposit larger than the state of Florida. A young mother and native Denè, Deranger struggles with family challenges while campaigning tirelessly against the Tar Sands and its proposed 2,000-mile Keystone XL Pipeline, which are destroying Indigenous communities and threatening an entire continent.

And in Australia, inventor and entrepreneur Jay Harman searches for investors willing to risk millions on his conviction that nature's own systems hold the key to our world's ecological problems. Harman finds his inspiration in the natural world's profound architecture and creates a revolutionary device that he believes can slow down global warming.

Separated by continents yet sharing an unwavering commitment to protecting nature, the characters in this story are complex, flawed, postmodern heroes for whom stemming the tide of environmental destruction fades in and out of view.

== Release ==
The film was premiered at the 2012 Mill Valley Film Festival. In 2012, it was screened at the International Film Festival of India, Wildscreen Festival in the United Kingdom, St. Louis International Film Festival, Red Rock Film Festival, Social Change Film Festival and Austin Film Festival.

== Reception ==
During its festival run, Elemental was reviewed by online and local publications including Variety, The Film Stage, Austin American-Statesman, Off to the Films, St. Louis Post-Dispatch and Lost in Reviews.

Dennis Harvey wrote in Variety that the film is "an interesting...view of eco-warriors at work" and "their efforts are duly inspiring and the related issues imposing". The Film Stage noted the film's "alarming intimacy" and stated, "Elemental is a rare, fresh look at environmental issues and sustainability that does not shy away from the personal impact the decisions to dedicate one's life to a cause entails."

Off to the Films called the documentary "beautifully shot", "heartbreaking, informative, and compelling". Lost in Reviews called the film "truly moving and engaging" and "one of the better environmental documentaries out there".

The St. Louis Post-Dispatch listed Elemental as one of the highlights of the 21st St. Louis International Film Festival, and called the film "inspirational", concluding, "The pro-active protagonists lift it from the muck of feel-bad documentaries."

San Francisco magazine highlighted the film as one of the best five documentaries at Mill Valley Film Festival, and the Austin American-Statesman called it one of the top documentaries at Austin Film Festival.
