= Melina Laboucan-Massimo =

Cree/Canadian climate justice and Indigenous rights advocate (born 1981)

- Born: 1981 (age 44–45); Peace River, Alberta, Canada
- Citizenship: Cree, Canadian
- Education: University of Victoria (MA) University of Alberta (BA)
- Organization(s): Sacred Earth Solar, Indigenous Climate Action
- Honours: David Suzuki Fellowship (2017)

Melina Laboucan-Massimo (born 1981) is a climate justice and Indigenous rights advocate from the Lubicon Cree community of Little Buffalo in northern Alberta, Canada. Growing up with firsthand experience of the effects of oil and gas drilling on local communities, she began advocating for an end to resource extraction in Indigenous territories but shifted focus to supporting a renewable energy transition after a ruptured pipeline spilled approximately 4.5 million litres of oil near Little Buffalo in 2011.

Laboucan-Massimo is a former campaigner with Greenpeace. She is the founder of Sacred Earth Solar and co-founder of Indigenous Climate Action, which support Indigenous-led clean energy and climate action projects in Canada. From 2010 to 2014, she co-organized the annual Tar Sands Healing Walk in Alberta, and in 2015 she helped construct a 20.8-kilowatt solar panel installation to power the local health centre in Little Buffalo. She is a Fellow at the David Suzuki Foundation. Her documentary series Power to the People has profiled renewable energy projects organized by Indigenous communities across Canada.

== Early life and education ==
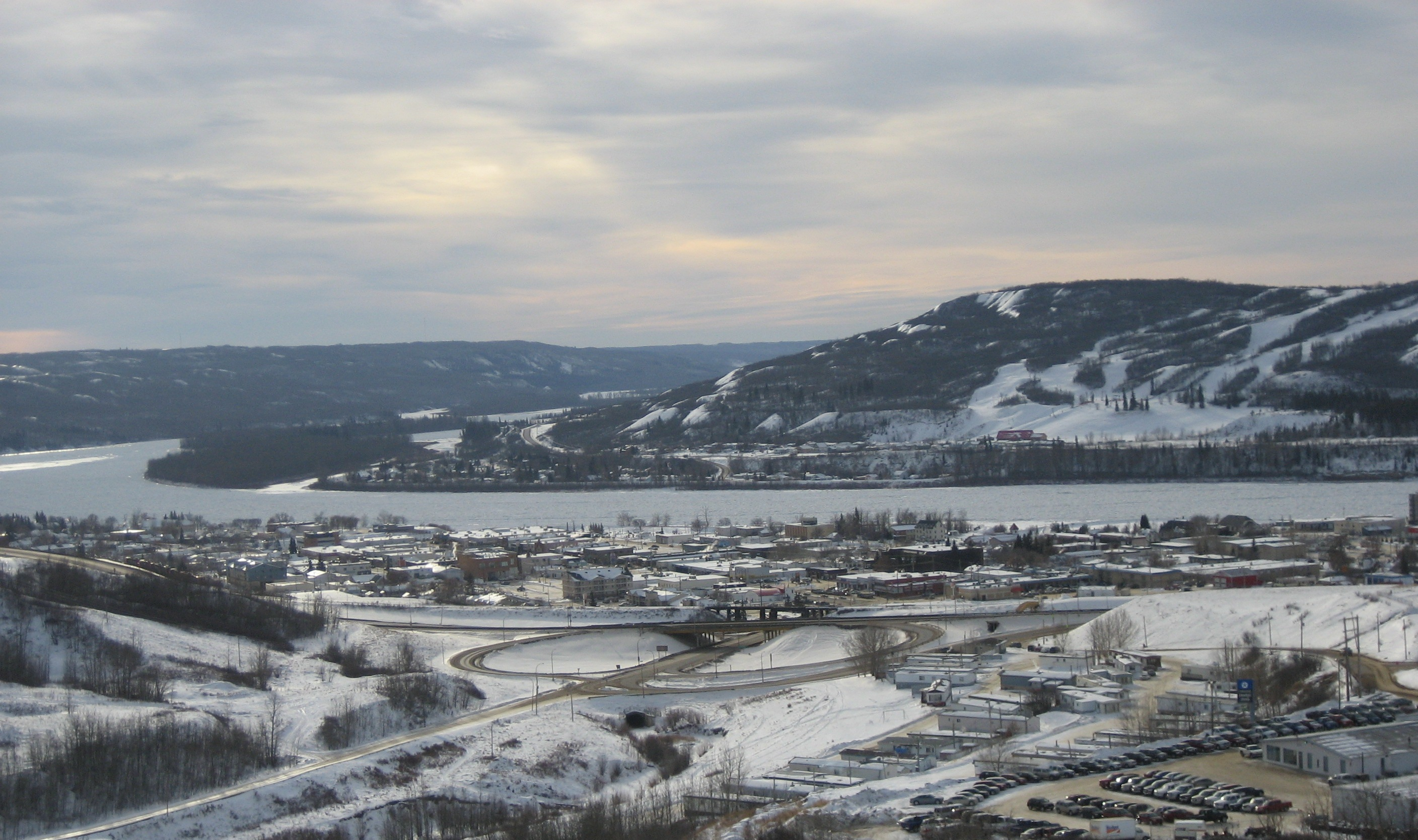
Peace River, Alberta

Melina Laboucan-Massimo was born in 1981 in Peace River, Alberta, to a Cree father and Italian mother. Laboucan-Massimo grew up in Little Buffalo, and is a member of the Lubicon Cree First Nation. In 1988, her community held a six-day protest against the effects of local oil and gas drilling, and the experience influenced Laboucan-Massimo's interest in activism and social justice. As a youth, she began advocating for an end to resource extraction in Indigenous territories, concerned about negative environmental and cultural impacts of the industry.

In 2002, Laboucan-Massimo participated in the City of Edmonton Youth Council. She completed a BA in Sociology at the University of Alberta, and during her studies became interested in Spanish literature and Latin American history, particularly in relation to the political struggles of Indigenous peoples in Latin America. She undertook an internship through the Canadian International Development Agency, and her work involved helping develop a teaching method to empower students to connect with each other, learn about different cultures and participate in global youth projects. After finishing her undergraduate degree, she travelled to Brazil, Mexico and Australia for various job and internship opportunities, finally moving to British Columbia to work with the Indigenous-focused Redwire Magazine.

In early 2009, Laboucan-Massimo was partway through a master's degree in Environmental Studies at York University, but took a leave of absence from the program when her mother was diagnosed with cancer. Her mother's illness, which Laboucan-Massimo suspected was linked to the environmental effects of living and working near the Alberta oil sands, inspired her to move home and find more opportunities for environmental activism.

== Advocacy work ==
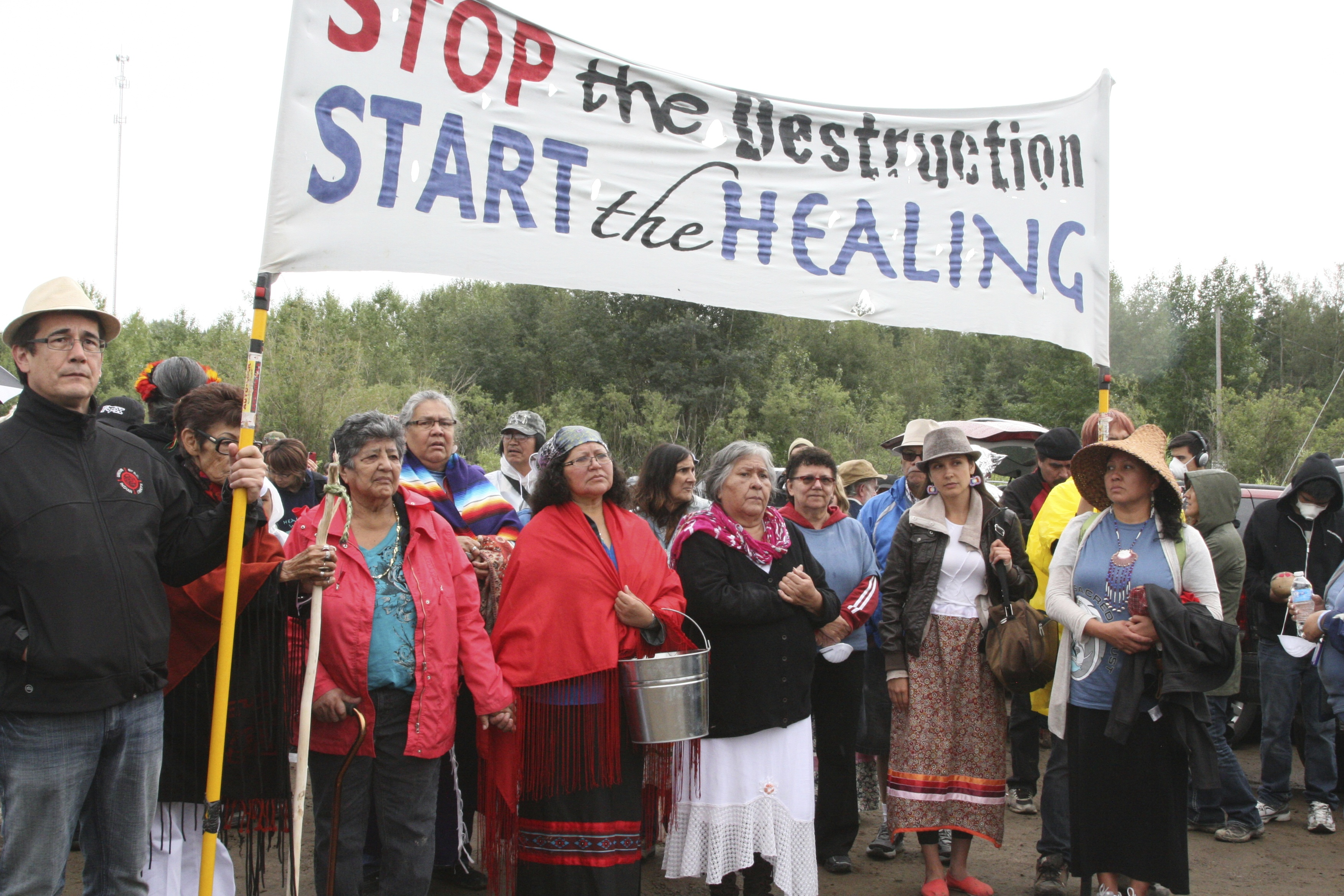
The Tar Sands Healing Walk in 2013

Laboucan-Massimo joined Greenpeace as a full-time campaigner in 2009. The following year, she became one of the founding organizers of the Tar Sands Healing Walk, a prayer walk and demonstration against the impacts of Alberta oil and gas extraction that took place annually from 2010 to 2014. When Greenpeace formally launched its schooner Rainbow Warrior III in 2011, Laboucan-Massimo performed a blessing on the ship with a Cree prayer and ceremony.

On April 29, 2011, a ruptured pipeline spilled approximately 4.5 million litres of oil near Little Buffalo. The leak was Alberta's largest in forty years. In the aftermath of the oil spill, Laboucan-Massimo's focus shifted to directly supporting a renewable energy transition. She worked on a photo essay with Greenpeace to document the oil spill effects on local communities, and in March 2012 she testified before a subcommittee of the United States House Committee on Energy and Commerce, presenting an argument against the construction of the Keystone XL pipeline.

In July 2013, Laboucan-Massimo's younger sister Bella Laboucan-McLean, an aspiring fashion designer living in Toronto, died from a fall off a condo balcony after a night out with five other people. Although Bella's death was considered suspicious by police, the investigation became stalled for lack of new information or evidence. Subsequently, Laboucan-Massimo joined calls for a national inquiry into missing and murdered Indigenous women in Canada, advocating for a more effective inquiry process created by and for the family members of those affected. A national inquiry was finally launched in late 2015.

Laboucan-Massimo completed a master's degree in Indigenous Governance from the University of Victoria with a focus on renewable energy, and in 2015, as part of her degree project, she helped with the construction of a 20.8-kilowatt solar panel installation to power the local health centre in Little Buffalo.

In 2015 Laboucan-Massimo founded Sacred Earth Solar, an initiative supporting Indigenous-led solar energy projects across Canada, and also co-founded the organization Indigenous Climate Action, which advocates for Indigenous-led climate change solutions. She has supported Secwépemc activists in their protests against the Trans Mountain pipeline expansion, providing solar panels to power their tiny houses built along the proposed pipeline expansion route for the purpose of asserting Secwépemc traditional law and land rights. In 2017 Laboucan-Massimo was one of the inaugural recipients of the David Suzuki Fellowship, which aims to support "solutions-oriented" scientific research and inspire community action. She used the C$50,000 grant and professional mentorship to expand on her master's degree research in renewable energy. Laboucan-Massimo became Indigenous Climate Action's just transition director in 2019. As of 2021, she was serving as a board member for Seeding Sovereignty and NDN Collective and as a member of the executive steering committee of the Indigenous Clean Energy Social Enterprise.

== Media ==
Laboucan-Massimo has made guest appearances in documentaries Revolution (2012), Beyond Crisis (2017), and The Condor & The Eagle (2019). In late 2019, Laboucan-Massimo's documentary series Power to the People aired on the Aboriginal Peoples Television Network. In its thirteen episodes, she profiled a range of renewable energy projects organized by Indigenous communities across Canada.

== Publications ==
- Laboucan-Massimo, Melina (2014). "Awaiting Justice: The Ceaseless Struggle of the Lubicon Cree". In D'Arcy, Stephen; Black, Toban; Weis, Tony; Kahn Russell, Joshua (eds.). A Line in the Tar Sands: Struggles for Environmental Justice. Between the Lines Books. pp. 113–117. ISBN 978-1-77113-109-4.
- ———— (2017). "From Our Homelands to the Tar Sands". In Christian, Dorothy; Wong, Rita (eds.). Downstream: Reimagining Water. Wilfrid Laurier University Press. pp. 81–88. ISBN 978-1-77112-215-3.
