= Life Chain =

Anti-abortion social movement organization

The Life Chain is an anti-abortion social movement organization. It was started in 1987 in Yuba City and Marysville by a small California-based anti-abortion rights ministry called Please Let Me Live. Every first Sunday of October, Life Chain invites various churches and congregations across the United States and Canada to stand on designated sidewalks to pray and rally for one hour.

== Backlash ==
In September 1991, Life Chain activists formed a demonstration in Manhattan, New York City during which 1,200 abortion rights opponents formed a "vast, sparse human cross." This relatively small number of Pro-Lifers was met with an opposing Pro-Choice demonstration, consisting of 4,000 pro-abortion marchers who rallied down the streets and "engulfed them in a roar of chants, shouts, and anger." No injuries were reported and only three people were taken in to custody for disorderly conduct. After the streets settled down, both sides were quick to claim victory; the pro-choice group, led by Rayna Baum, saw success in its superior numbers, while the anti-abortion group saw success in their being faithful in their service to God in the face of overwhelming opposition.
