= SoChange =

Canadian charitable organization

SoChange is a non-governmental organization (NGO) based in Oakville, Ontario, Canada, that was founded in 2008 with the stated intention of inspiring individuals and organizations to work towards the tangible quality-of-life improvements for those who are currently disenfranchised.

== History ==
SoChange was founded in 2008 by comedian David Peck originally from Toronto, Ontario. Among its projects have been the Mosquitoes Suck Tour, about malaria prevention; Dreamriders, a scholarship program for youth in Malawi; and the YChange Conference, which has engaged in themes such as climate change and religious tolerance.

== Activities ==
To date, event planning has constituted a large share of the organization's activity base.

The organization participated in the Spread the Net campaign by piloting a third-party fundraising event, entitled the "Mosquitoes Suck: The Tour," at a high school in Guelph, Ontario.

SoChange has also assisted in grant writing, educational and awareness raising activities, and project design.
