= Cleo Reece =

Canadian Indigenous activist and filmmaker

Cleo Reece is a Cree Métis Red Power movement activist, environmental activist, and filmmaker. She is currently a band councilor for Fort McMurray #468 First Nation.

Cleo is the mother of Skeena Reece, and has taken part in some of Skeena's work. This includes the performance piece I Still Know, which was performed as a part of Skeena's solo exhibition at the Morris and Helen Belkin Art Gallery in 2019.

== Activism and filmmaking ==
Much of Reece's environmental activism highlights the intersections of resource extraction and its ongoing negative effects on the environment, and its effects on Indigenous peoples' lives, bodies, and territories. Drawing from a background in film making, she often uses film alongside activism on site. She produced the 1998 film Red Power Women, which focuses on a lively community of urban Indigenous women in North Vancouver, and reflects on the political coalition they formed in the 1970s as a form of self-empowerment. She was also involved in the production of No Turning Back, a 1997 documentary film which followed Royal Commission on Aboriginal Peoples across Canada.

In 2010 she co-organized the Keepers of the Athabasca's first 13-kilometer Healing Walk, which was undertaken to draw attention to the negative environmental consequences of development in the Fort McMurray area, including resource extraction in the tar sands.

== Indigenous Media Arts Group ==
Reece was a co-founder of the Indigenous Media Arts Group (IMAG), and the director from foundation until 2005. IMAG was a coalition of Indigenous media artists organized to improve access to media equipment and increase Indigenous representation in artist run centers in the Vancouver area, and ran from 1998 to 2007. IMAG grew out of the First Nations Arts Performance group (FNAP), which was organized by Margo Kane and operated out of Video In from 1992 until 1995. In addition to providing access to equipment and mentoring for and by Indigenous media makers, including mentorship by Indigenous filmmakers such as Dana Claxton and Loretta Todd, IMAG held the annual IMAGeNation Aboriginal Film and Video Festival. Reece stepped down as director of IMAG in 2005, and IMAG closed in 2007.
