= Voices-Voix =

Voices-Voix was a Canadian coalition of organizations and individuals seeking to defend democracy and enable civil society. It operated between 2010-2020. Voices-Voix worked on government accountability mainly at the federal level and focused on the rule of law, free speech, transparency, and equality. Working with allies, the Coalition also tracked the independence and integrity of Parliamentary institutions (including officers and agents of Parliament), the role of the Canadian government in working with Canadian companies working overseas, the promotion of the role of public science and environmental protection, and support for the rights of organized labour.

== History ==
In April 2010, more than 100 representatives of organizations from across Canada assembled in Ottawa to address the state of democracy and especially what appeared to be unprecedented sustained attacks on civil society under the Harper federal government. The Voices-Voix Coalition was formed in response to these concerns, and led by organizations working in international cooperation, women's equality, human rights, immigrant and refugee settlement groups, and Indigenous activism. The Coalition noted that open and healthy democracy in Canada requires tolerance for peaceful dissent.

The Coalition was diverse and included environmental groups, unions, academics, human rights organizations, international development organizations and other civil society groups. They shared goals of democracy, human rights - including minority and women's rights- the environment and sustainable development, peace and respect for the law. Under the Voices-Voix umbrella, the organizations united in the belief that democracy, free speech, transparency and equality must be better respected and protected by the Canadian government.

Voices-Voix was among the first in Canada to adapt the concept of an enabling environment that is used widely in the international development context and apply it domestically to civil society in Canada. Its research revealed an overwhelming bias against progressive organizations by the Harper government using a range of tactics, from public vilifications to defunding and attempts to strip leading Canadian non-profits of their charitable status.

In 2013, Voices-Voix launched a national research network to curate and develop research and case studies documenting the state of civil society in Canada, the strength of free expression and the rights to dissent. The network's Editorial Board include leading Canadian academics and practitioners.

The case studies rapidly became the central focus of Voices-Voix's work and by 2015, the Coalition had documented more than 125 case studies. The work has been cited in mainstream media, submissions to the United Nations, reports by the Special rapporteur on the rights to freedom of association and peaceful assembly, the international NGO CIVICUS, and the CCPA publication The Harper Record 2008-2015 among others. In 2015, shortly before the federal general election, the Coalition launched its report, Dismantling Democracy that received widespread attention. The Harper Conservatives responded by calling the Report authors supporters of terrorism.

Voices-Voix continued to document case studies under the Trudeau Liberal government until 2019 when it held its closing conference at the University of Ottawa. It closed its website in 2020. Most of its material is still available on the Voices-Voix Facebook page.

== Structure and vision ==
Voices-Voix was a non-profit and non-partisan coalition. Organizations with headquarters in Canada could become members after endorsing the Voices-Voix Declaration. The coalition was inclusive but prohibited political parties. Member-organizations become part of a dialogue related to the collective action necessary in order to achieve their common objectives.

The communications coordinator was the coalition’s only staff member, an expense covered by donations from member-organizations. The Coalition related heavily on volunteers and student interns, overseen by the Editorial Committee, to develop case studies.

The coalition was based on the premise that Canadians elect representatives in order to have their voices heard - not ignored or silenced - and that elected officials are morally obligated to respect the voices and to represent the will of the people. Voices-Voix sought to raise awareness on issues of free speech, transparency and equality in Canada which they believe, are necessary elements of a more informed citizenry and a thriving democracy.

The Voices-Voix declaration called on the government of Canada to: firstly, respect the right to freedom of opinion and expression, secondly, to act in accordance with Canada’s democratic values and thirdly, to be transparent - which includes demonstrating accountability and keeping partisan agendas separate from funding decisions.
