= Peder Paus (businessman) =

Norwegian banker and investor

Peder Nicolas Paus
- Born: November 22, 1945 (age 80); Oslo, Norway
- Education: University of California, Berkeley
- Occupations: Banker and investor
- Organization: Questerre Energy Corporation
- Family: Paus family

Peder Nicolas Paus (pronounced [ˈpèːdər ˈpæʉs]; born 22 November 1945) is a Norwegian banker and investor in the petroleum industry. He is a co-founder and former chairman of the international oil and gas exploration company Questerre Energy Corporation.

== Background ==
He is a member of the Paus family from Oslo and is a son of the steel industrialist and lawyer Per Paus and Countess Hedevig Wedel-Jarlsberg, and is a grandson of Lord Chamberlain Peder Anker Wedel-Jarlsberg, Count of Wedel-Jarlsberg. He is the brother-in-law of Cecilie Paus, one of the main owners of Wilh. Wilhelmsen since 1978. He is married to the businesswoman Nine Olrich Paus, formerly the Marchioness de Olaso (a title in the Spanish and Papal nobility) by her first marriage to a Spanish-French nobleman. Peder Paus obtained a Master of Business Administration degree at the University of California, Berkeley in 1971.

== Career ==
He has held key positions in the bank Manufacturers Hanover Trust in London and New York. From 1981 to 1995, he was CEO of the shipping company North Ltd Venture in London. He has also been a consultant for the British Ministry of Defence and the British Export Credits Guarantee Department.

Paus co-founded Questerre Energy Corporation, an oil and gas exploration company listed on Toronto Stock Exchange and Oslo Stock Exchange, and has been the company's chairman and largest shareholder. He became a member of the board of directors in 2000 and was chairman from 2006 to 2015.
