= 2011 Little Buffalo oil spill =

The Little Buffalo oil spill on April 29, 2011, resulted in the discharge of 28,000 barrels of oil in an isolated stretch of boreal forest in northern Alberta, about ten kilometres from Little Buffalo, Alberta. The spill was caused by rain then damaging the pipes in the Rainbow Pipeline system, owned by Plains Midstream Canada, a unit of Plains All American Pipeline. It was the largest oil spill in Alberta in 36 years. The local school was closed following the oil spill due to concerns about the effects of fumes.

The 44-year-old Rainbow Pipeline carries an average of 187,000 barrels a day from Zama, Alberta to Edmonton. Little Buffalo, a Lubicon Cree community of about 350 people, is approximately ten kilometres from the spill site. Local news reports stated that many of the 125 children attending the local school began complaining of headaches, dizziness and nausea around 9:30 a.m. on April 29. The school was closed for the day on the day of the spill (Friday), but was evacuated again the following Monday due to the odour and effects on the children.

In 2013, Alberta's Energy Resource Conservation Board (ERCB) issued a reprimand to Plains Mainstream for operational failures in connection with the oil spill.

== Response ==
School principal Brian Alexander and chief Steve Noskey of the Lubicon Cree First Nation both expressed concern about the lack of response or information from the Energy Resources Conservation Board (ERCB) in the week following the spill. Provincial Environment Minister Rob Renner told reporters that the spill is in a "very remote area," and though a large spill, was under control. Renner said he was unaware of potential impacts on humans. Although he did not discount the community's health concerns, he said it was unlikely that the odours would carry dangerous chemicals. According to Alberta Environment spokesman Trevor Gemmell, the spill was contained in stands of stagnant water and was 300 metres from any flowing water.

Within two weeks, the company had cleaned up about 33 percent of the oil, the oil pooled on top of the open water. However, it was estimated that it would take six months to recover most of the oil, including that which had soaked into the vegetation. Everyone involved admitted that restoring it fully was out of the question. The ERCB is the agency responsible for determining the cause of the leak. According to technician Sandra Blais that means analyzing the age of the pipeline. The pipeline had a spill in 2006 and the Alberta energy regulator determined that it was caused by corrosion. The pipeline has carried diluted bitumen, the oil sands product claimed by environmentalists claim to be harder on pipes than conventional oil. This is denied by industry officials.

== Issues ==
According to a report in The Globe and Mail, four things went wrong in the Rainbow spill:

=== Underlying cause ===
In 2010, after company monitoring flagged a problem, the line was dug up and repaired. However, when the pipe was replaced, the soil beneath it was insufficient and over the next year, the line sagged and eventually broke. Fixes of this nature are considered minor and are not monitored by regulators

=== Delays in detecting break ===
According to the company, the break probably happened around 7:00 p.m. on April 28. Operators attempted several restarts before the pressure dropped early Friday morning. Due to the location in a remote area only accessible by helicopter at the time, the break was not confirmed until twelve hours later, just after dawn Friday. By then, thousands of barrels had poured into the muskeg. According to Reg Eadie, an engineering professor and pipeline expert at the University of Alberta, that delay is among the most troubling parts of the spill.

=== Initial response inadequate ===
With an estimated 28,000 barrels spilled, it was Alberta's largest spill since the mid-1970s. However, for four days, provincial officials said the spill was only several hundred barrels. It was not until May 3, a day after the federal election, that the province admitted it was 45 times larger. Premier Ed Stelmach admitted that the initial response was slow and pledged to hold the company's "feet to the fire."

=== Lack of communication ===
Little Buffalo has a school whose students and staff make up more than a third of the community's population. Although the spill happened on a Thursday, the school was not formally advised about the spill until the following Tuesday. Meanwhile, children complained of nausea and headaches on Friday, Monday and Tuesday. Locals say that the lack of urgency was likely due to the low initial estimates of the size of the spill.

== Investigation report ==
On February 26, 2013 Alberta's Energy Resource Conservation Board issued four high-risk enforcement actions against the pipeline owner, Calgary-based Plains Mainstream. The investigation by the ERCB revealed operational failures by the company, including inadequate leak detection and emergency response. Plains Mainstream will be required to engage a third-party audit of its ability to manage communications during a crisis. The company was also responsible for a spill near Sundre, Alberta in 2012. An ERCB high-risk enforcement action indicates that the incident has both public safety and environmental impacts. It is the most serious offence companies can be found in non-compliance with. According to the ERCB, the pipeline was shut down for 122 days. "This spill was one of the largest we've seen in Alberta... We wanted to make sure the message was sent to Plains and we're hoping beyond Plains all of the pipeline industry sees how seriously we're taking this and how seriously we will be taking this going forward."

The company responded in a press release: "Plains is carefully reviewing the ERCB's investigation report to determine whether any further findings and improvements can be applied to our operations. We have finalized the results of our own detailed investigation and have applied those lessons learned to improve our overall operations." However, Greenpeace Canada said that the ERCB should have taken stronger action with Plains Midstream."The Energy Resources Conservation Board's report is a damning indictment of pipeline safety in Alberta as yet another pipeline company has failed to protect Alberta's environment and people and only received the lightest slap on the wrist," said Greenpeace Climate and Energy Campaigner Melina Laboucan-Massimo.

== Charges ==
On April 26, 2013 Plains Midstream Canada was charged with three counts of violating environmental protection laws relating to the spill. The charges pertain to: "the spill itself, failing to take all reasonable measures to repair the problem and not pursuing all steps possible to remediate and dispose of the oil that contaminated over three hectares of beaver ponds and muskeg in a densely forested area."
