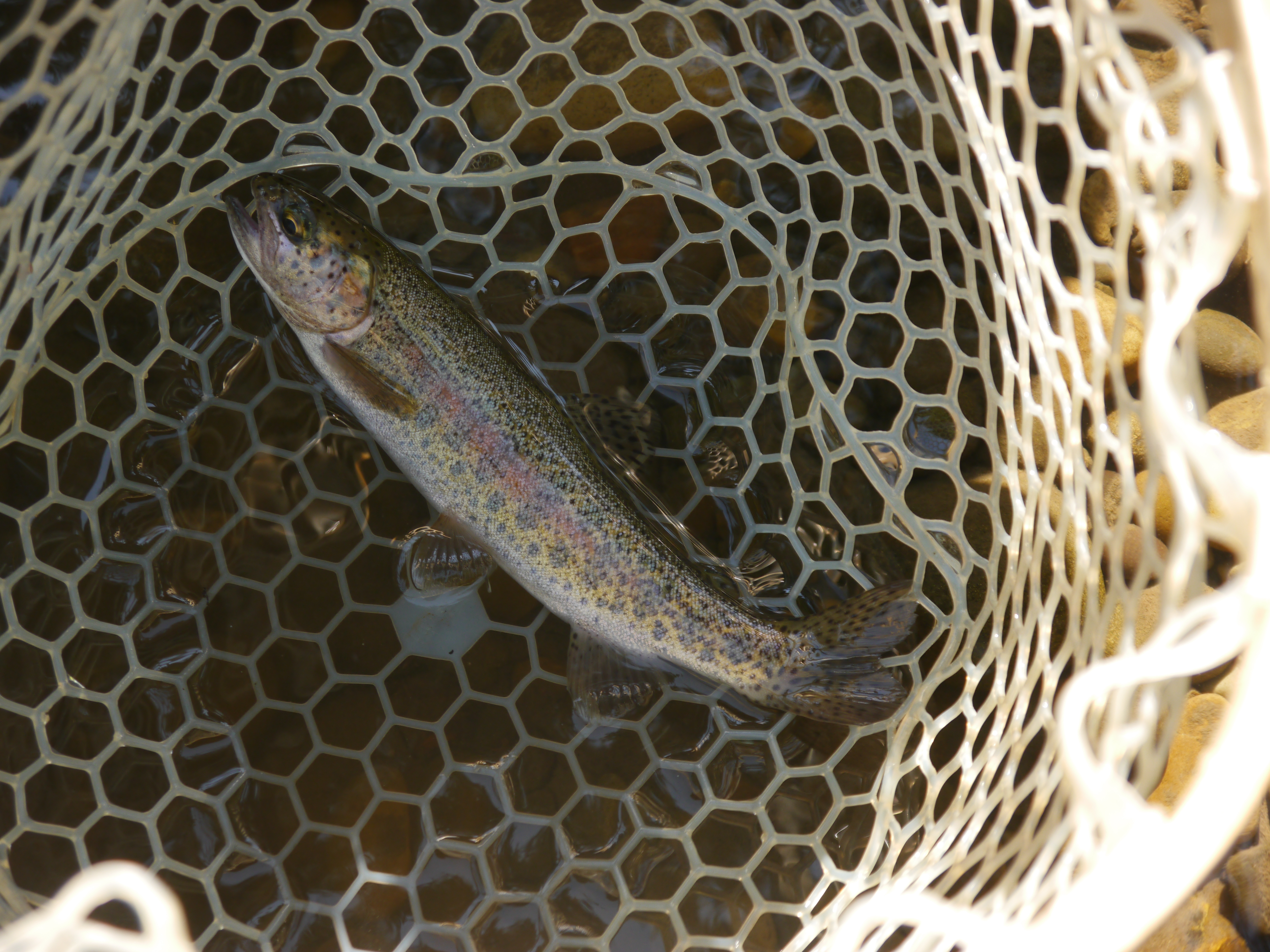

Conservation status
- Endangered (COSEWIC)

Scientific classification
- Kingdom: Animalia
- Phylum: Chordata
- Class: Actinopterygii
- Division: Teleostei
- Order: Salmoniformes
- Family: Salmonidae
- Genus: Oncorhynchus
- Species: O. mykiss
- Population: Athabasca rainbow trout

= Athabasca rainbow trout =

Subspecies of fish

The Athabasca rainbow trout is a population of rainbow trout (Oncorhynchus mykiss), a fish in the family Salmonidae.

== Taxonomy ==
The Athabasca rainbow trout was considered as a form of the Columbia River redband trout (O. mykiss gairdneri) subspecies in the trout handbook of Robert J. Behnke (1992), but considered a separate, yet unnamed subspecies by L. M. Carl of the Ontario Ministry of Resources in work published in 1994.

They are not considered a distinct subspecies from other rainbow trout.

== Habitat ==
The Athabasca rainbow trout is primarily found in the cold headwaters of the Athabasca drainage in Alberta, Canada. The Athabasca rainbow trout is one of the few native rainbow trout populations found in an Arctic Ocean watershed. The Athabasca River is a tributary of the Mackenzie River system which flows north into the Arctic Ocean.

In the winter they will use the largest and deepest pools in any occupied stream as an overwintering spot.

== Reproduction ==
The Athabasca rainbow trout spawn in the springtime in streams with fine gravels that are free of silts in clays, and that also have moderate flow rates. They spawn later in the spring than other rainbow trout.

== Conservation status ==
The Athabasca rainbow trout used to be considered a "May be at risk" species in Alberta due to potential habitat loss and hybridization with introduced rainbow trout". As of August 2019 it is designated under the Species At Risk Act (SARA) as Endangered. Their main threats are invasive species and the increased competition they bring, introgression with non-native rainbow trout introduced as game fish, fishing pressures, habitat loss and fragmentation, sedimentation, climate change, and water pollution.
