= Obed Mountain coal mine spill =

2013 waste accident in Alberta, Canada

Coordinates: 53.565°N 117.52°W

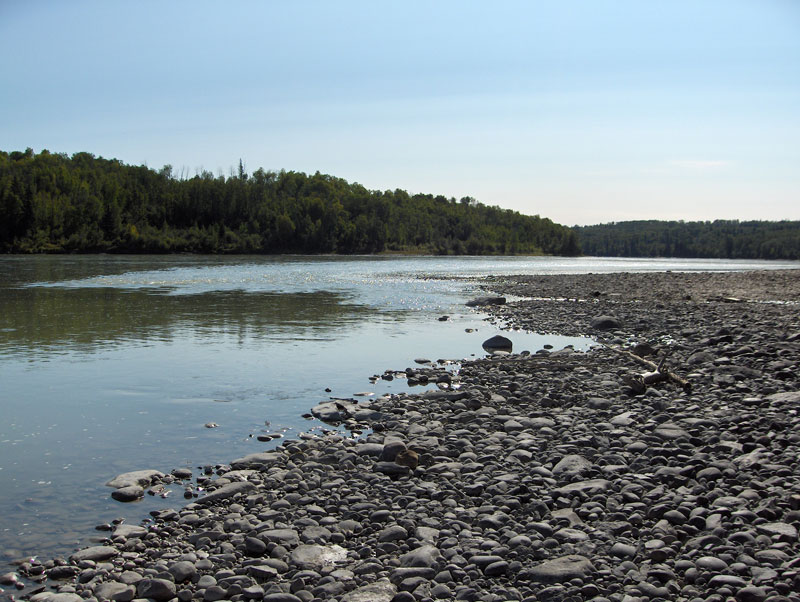
Athabasca River

On October 31, 2013, a waste pit at the Obed Mountain Mine failed near the town of Hinton in Alberta, Canada. Following the collapse of a tailings dam, up to 1 billion litres (260 million US gallons) of wastewater flooded into the nearby Athabasca River in what may have been the largest coal slurry spill in Canadian history. The river's waters experienced immediate spikes in arsenic, metals, and carcinogenic polycyclic aromatic hydrocarbons (PAHs). Although the Athabasca was deemed safe for drinking and wildlife by the end of the year, the extent of the environment's recovery remained in doubt.

== Spill ==
Located about 30 km (19 mi) east of Hinton, the Obed Mountain Mine was a 7,460-hectare (18,400-acre) thermal coal mine with the capacity to produce about 3.2 million tonnes (7.1 billion pounds) of coal per year; 2.6 million tonnes (5.7 billion pounds) are proven to exist, and up to 84.7 million more tonnes (187 billion pounds) were posited. Tailings ponds were constructed to contain water used to wash coal; besides wastewater, the pools also contained fine rock and clay particles, unrecovered coal, and flocculents. Operations were suspended in 2012 because of economic pressures, and around 624 hectares (1,540 acres) of the mine had been reclaimed.

On October 31, 2013, one of the mine's tailings dams failed, and between 600 million and one billion litres (160 to 260 million US gal) of slurry poured into the Plante and Apetowun Creeks. The plume of waste products then joined the Athabasca River, travelling downstream for a month before settling in Lake Athabasca near Fort Chipewyan, over 500 km (310 mi) away.

== Environmental impact ==
In the first month after the spill, water quality tests revealed the presence of metals and chemicals such as cadmium, arsenic, manganese, lead, mercury, and polycyclic aromatic hydrocarbons (PAHs) in excess of limits for consumption or life along the first 40 km (25 mi) of the Athabasca River. Mercury, for instance, was found to be nine times higher than normal, while PAHs were at levels four times higher than the Canadian standard for potable water. As a result, residents were discouraged from drinking any of the Athabasca as well as watering any livestock or pets.

By December 2013, as the plume reached Fort McMurray, government officials reported that water from the Athabasca was once again below safety thresholds for both wildlife and drinking water. Monitoring continued for at least two years, although First Nations representatives disputed the rigour of the sampling program, its exclusion of data from sediment, and the lack of information made available to the public.

== Aftermath ==
In October 2015, the Alberta Energy Regulator corporation filed charges against the mine's operators, Sheritt Coal and Coal Valley Resources Inc., on several counts of violations of the Environmental Protection and Enhancement Act, the Water Act, and the Public Lands Act which could have amounted up to a $2.2 million fine. Proceedings began on January 20, 2016.

In June 2017, Prairie Mines & Royalty, formerly known as Coal Valley Resources, a subsidiary of Sheritt Coal, was fined $4.5 million after the company pled guilty to two violations of federal law under the Fisheries Act and one violation of Alberta's Environmental Protection and Enhancement Act.
