= Canada Strong and Free Network =

Canadian conservative political advocacy group

Canada Strong & Free Network
- Motto: Networking Canada's Conservative Movement
- Founder: Preston Manning
- Established: 2005
- President: Adam Bolek
- Location: Calgary, Canada
- Website: Official website

The Canada Strong and Free Network (formerly the Manning Centre for Building Democracy (MCBD) or Manning Centre) based in Calgary, Alberta, is a not-for-profit political advocacy group that was established in 2005 by Preston Manning to promote conservative principles. It was known for the annual "high-profile" Manning Networking Conference (MNC). The Manning Centre operates the for-profit think tank the Manning Foundation, which undertakes some research and analysis, while the Manning Centre self-describes as a "do-tank", that focuses on advocacy, training and networking events for conservatives.

== Background ==
Preston Manning founded the Manning Centre for Building Democracy in 2005 and the Manning Foundation, shortly after he retired from a lengthy career in politics.

Manning and Mike Harris wrote a series together that was published by the Fraser Institute including "A Canada Strong and Free" in 2005, "Rebalanced and revitalized: A Canada strong and free" and "Building Prosperity in a Canada Strong and Free" in 2006, International Leadership by a Canada Strong and Free in May 2017 and "Vision for a Canada Strong and Free" in 2007.

The Manning Centre provided a networking opportunity for "conservatives from different provincial parties", and their "federal counterparts" and a space to "exchange ideas and propose policy initiatives", according to Chuck Strahl, who was Manning Centre's chairman and had served as a Reform MP and Conservative cabinet minister under Prime Minister Harper. Prior to the creation of the Manning Centre, there "wasn't a networking opportunity for what Preston always called the 'conservative movement,' as opposed to political parties." Preston believed that "the conservative movement benefit[ed] from getting together, in all of its facets, and without having the party hierarchy managing it or overlooking it. This was the best way to get the best conservative ideas."

Conservatives that the MC targets include "card-carrying Tory loyalists", "those who feel more comfortable outside the tent", and "those who lean more towards the libertarian or social conservative side of the true-blue ideological spectrum."

There is an interlocking of the Conservative Party of Canada and the Manning Centre at the level of the board of directors, staff members, and participation at the annual conferences.

In 2018 the Centre shifted away from advocacy and increased focus on hosting conferences. As a result, about 50 percent of the permanent staff were laid off and part of its Calgary downtown building was leased.

In 2020, Lanigan said that the Centre and the Manning Networking Conference were in the process of being renamed and "rebranded". The newly branded entity will continue to break "down silos"—"getting conservatives to work together and work strategically to create opportunities for success", as Manning had done.

The rebranding will not change the mandate of "supporting conservatism in Canada...by networking best practices and ideas pertaining to limited government, free enterprise, individual responsibility and a more robust civil society."

== Mandate ==
The Manning Centre supports small government, free market, and individual liberties and promotes "Canada's conservative movement."

The motto is "Networking Canada's Conservative Movement".

The Manning Centre trains people to participate in federal, provincial and/or municipal partisan politics. The Manning Centre self-describes as a "do-tank" not a think tank as it "does not try to generate new ideas."

In his 2016 publication on the "global think tank phenomenon", Donald E. Abelson described the different functions of the Manning Foundation, the Manning Centre and the Manning Networking Conference. While Jan Gerson's September 20, 2014 National Post profile of five Canadian think tanks included the Manning Centre, Abelson said that MCBD does not "conduct research and analysis", which is the function of the for-profit institute, the Manning Foundation. The Foundation is the think tank and the MCBD helps "educate and train future leaders of the conservative movement" by "offering internships and sponsoring various educational programs, seminars, and workshops", and by participating in "several partisan-related activities and events". He said that the "express purpose" of the MNC is to "organize larger events at which policy-makers, academics, journalists, students, donors, and other groups of individuals can interact."

The Centre's charitable branch, the Manning Foundation, does conduct some research and provides a way for donors to support them. However, Manning said that neither the Centre or the Foundation conduct original research. He said that instead of "trying to compete or replace the conservative-oriented think tanks, The Centre is "basically trying to take much of the work [think tanks] do, interpret it and translate it into action that results in the implementation of policies."

The Manning Centre has often been compared to the progressive and social democratic think tank Broadbent Institute, which was established in 2011. They were both founded by "former political party leaders" and they both "identify as partisan organizations". However, the Broadbent Institute and the Manning Foundation—unlike other organizations operating within the think tank sector—are not registered as charities—which "allows them to operate without limits on their partisanship". Both organizations focus on "communicating and developing the skills of the masses and attempting to influence public policy from the bottom up".

== Administration ==
The Centre is managed by the board of directors with Troy Lanigan as president. Lanigan was formerly president of the Canadian Taxpayers Federation. Current members of the board of directors include Joe Oliver, who served as Finance Minister under then Prime Minister Stephen Harper and is now on the board of directors of High Arctic Energy Services. Cliff Fryers, Jocelyn Williams Bamford, Chuck Strahl, and Questerre Energy's CEO Michael Binnion, who also serves on the High Arctic Energy Services board, and Preston Manning.

Preston Manning PC CC AOE, was the founding father of the Centre and served as its director until July 2016, when he resigned from his executive functions with the Manning Foundation and the Centre. He continued to support and pursue its objectives.

On January 16, 2020 Manning announced that he was retiring from the Centre, to spend more time with his family.

Members of the board of trustees have included former Premier of Ontario, Mike Harris and Gwyn Morgan CM, who has also served as a trustee of the Fraser Institute's, and on the board of directors of SNC-Lavalin and EnCana Corporation. In 2003, Morgan was "the most powerful man in Canada's oil patch", according to Maclean's magazine. Past directors include Kevin Lacey, the Atlantic representative of the Canadian Taxpayers Federation.

== Funding ==
The annual budget of the Manning Centre is not made public. However, in a 2011 presentation, Nicholas Gafuik, who was then a MC Senior Fellow and previously a managing director, said that since its inception in 2005, the Manning Centre had won "commitments for funding" of about $30 million, which represented about $4 million a year.

Some corporate sponsors support both the Manning Networking Conference and the Broadbent Institute's Progress Summit. Banks and the petroleum industry tend to support the MNC while labour unions tended to support the Progress Summit.

The lead sponsor of the Manning Networking Conference 2019 held in March in Ottawa was the Modern Miracle Network (MMN), an advocacy organization that was incorporated in 2016 by Michael Binnion and operates out of Questerre Energy's offices.

== Activities ==
=== Manning Networking Conference ===
For twelve years, the Manning Centre organized the annual "high-profile" Manning Networking Conference. Global News journalist Tom Clark said that Manning Networking Conference (MNC) was like "Woodstock for Conservative Canadians." and the Hill Times called it the Coachella for conservatives.

In 2010, Nicholas Gafuik, who was at that time the Executive Director of the Manning Centre, said the reason behind the 2010 Manning Centre's Conference on Alberta's Future was that Alberta was in a "time of change" and there was a "need to generate ideas, proposals, and plans for shaping a more positive and inspiring future" for Alberta. Keynote speakers included Mark Milke from the Frontier Centre for Public Policy, Michael Percy, Marlo Raynolds from the Pembina Institute, Peter McCormick, Peter Cowley and Nadeem Esmail from the Fraser Institute, and Monte Solberg a former Federal Minister.

The 2011 MNC included Nicholas Gafuik as a key speaker.

The 2013 Manning Networking Conference (MNC13) key note speakers included Ezra Levant, 2012 Republican Presidential Candidate Ron Paul, and Harper cabinet minister, Jason Kenney. It also featured Nigel Farage, the leader of UKIP and John Howard, the former Australian prime minister.

In 2014, CBC News described the two-day annual conference, which was then in its sixth year, as a "pre-spring tradition" where "small- and big-C conservatives" converge in Ottawa to "hobnob with senior federal cabinet ministers, talk policy with provincial premiers and trade tips with some of the country's most successful campaign strategists." The CBC said that the MNC had "grown steadily in size, scope and — perhaps most critically — influence within Canada's conservative movement." The "political debate" was "spirited and substantial" and the "ManningFest" was at that time "one of the hottest political tickets in town." Key speakers included Mark Steyn, Jim Prentice, Brad Wall and Ross Douthat. Breakout sessions included speakers such as Jason Kenney, Dimitri Pantazopoulos on "Conservatives and the City", Susan Delacourt on "Shopping for Votes", Paul Wells on "The Longer I'm Prime Minister", Bob Plamandon "The Truth About Trudeau", and Tom Flanagan on "Winning Power". There was a panel for journalists which include CBC News Network's Power & Politics contributors, John Ivison from the National Post, Jennifer Ditchburn from the Canadian Press, Bob Fife from CTV News, and Luiza Ch. Savage from Maclean's.

Key speakers at the 2015 Manning Networking Conference (MNC15), which was held on March 7 and 8, included Christy Clark, Jim Prentice, Darrell Pasloski, Tony Clement and James Moore. Topics discussed included "Technology and Politics" "Perpetual Fundraising Machine", "income-splitting", "market-based environmentalism, euthanasia, "Islamic extremism, municipalities and the runaway Supreme Court". Jason Kenney, who was then serving as Defence Minister under Prime Minister Stephen Harper, gave a speech on "defending Canada's values and interests" and Strahl talk was on the "State of the Conservative Movement." In his March 2015 article, National Post columnist Andrew Coyne described as "emptiness" and "careerism" displaying "how vapid Canadian conservatism has become."

Sponsors for the tenth annual MNC held in Ottawa for four days in February, included Enbridge, the Canadian Association of Petroleum Producers (CAPP), and CN Railways, according to Maclean's. Questerre Energy's CEO, Micheal Binnion, who is also on the CAPP's board of governors, was a prominent speaker at the 2018 MNC. During the panel discussion entitled "Development and Sustainability", Binnion took credit for outlining the "key elements of the Conservative's energy platform". Binnion suggested alternatives to the carbon tax introduced by federal government under Prime Minister Justin Trudeau. Binnion notes included alternatives such as "regulation by target reductions", "targeted regulation by caps", an "incentive-based approach", "conservationism", "green technology credits, or doing nothing until Canada’s trading partners demand it."

=== Municipal governance project ===
In early March 2013 at a conference in Ottawa, David Seymour, a Manning senior fellow the project manager for the Manning Centre's municipal governance project—Dimitri Pantazopoulos, described the changes they wanted to see in municipal politics which they described as a "field dominated by over-spenders and over-regulators". The Manning Centre launched their municipal governance project during the 2013 Calgary municipal election, providing free seminars and receiving free training to five municipal candidates in five wards, as part of their "mission to make city halls across Canada more conservative". Calgarians have voted conservative at the federal and provincial level but are far less conservative at the municipal level. The candidate "largely agree[d] that city council needs to be more conservative". (Note: Pantazopoulos did "strategy and public opinion research" for both Prime Minister Stephen Harper and Joe Clark, and more recently for Ontario premier Doug Ford and as "senior strategic adviser" for Jason Kenney's UCP campaign.)

=== 2019 Canadian federal election ===
In the run up to the 2019 Canadian federal election, the Manning Centre provided a "total of $312,450 to a network of related third-party advertising groups" operating on Facebook and Instagram. This included $240,000 to Canada Strong and Proud for a "series of anti-Trudeau and anti-Liberal campaign ads." The Centre also "gave $4,500 to Newfoundland and Labrador Strong and another $11,200 to Nova Scotia Strong.

In 2018, Manning called for a "co-ordinated response" by governments, companies, and citizens Canadians to the opposition against pipelines, by creating a Corridors Coalition. The Coalition would create and maintain a transportation corridor for Canadian oil and natural resources, running from the Pacific to the Atlantic, and eventually to the Arctic Ocean. Manning called for the creation of the Coalition for mid-2019 to "offer a clear and powerful challenge to the federal political parties contesting the 2019 federal election in the fall".

== See also ==
- Broadbent Institute
