= Legacy pollution =

Pollution caused by historical use of a chemical

Legacy pollution or legacy pollutants are persistent materials in the environment that were created through a polluting industry or process that have polluting effects after the process has finished. Frequently these include persistent organic pollutants, heavy metals or other chemicals residual in the environment long after the industrial or extraction processes that produced them. Often these are chemicals produced by industry and polluted before there was widespread awareness of the toxic effects of the pollutants, and subsequently regulated or banned. Notable legacy pollutants include mercury, PCBs, dioxins and other chemicals that elicit widespread health and environmental effects. Sites for legacy pollutants include mining sites, industrial parks, waterways contaminated by industry, and other dump sites.

These chemicals often have outsized impact in countries’ jurisdictions with little or no environmental monitoring or regulation—because the chemical were often produced in new jurisdictions after they were banned in more heavily regulated jurisdictions. Often in these countries, there is a lack of capacity in environmental regulatory, health and civic infrastructure to address the impact of the pollutants.

The impact of legacy pollutants can be visible many years after the initial polluting process, and require environmental remediation. Grassroots communities and environmental defenders frequently advocate for responsibility of industry and states through environmental justice action and advocacy for recognition of human rights, such as the right to a healthy environment.

== Brownfields ==
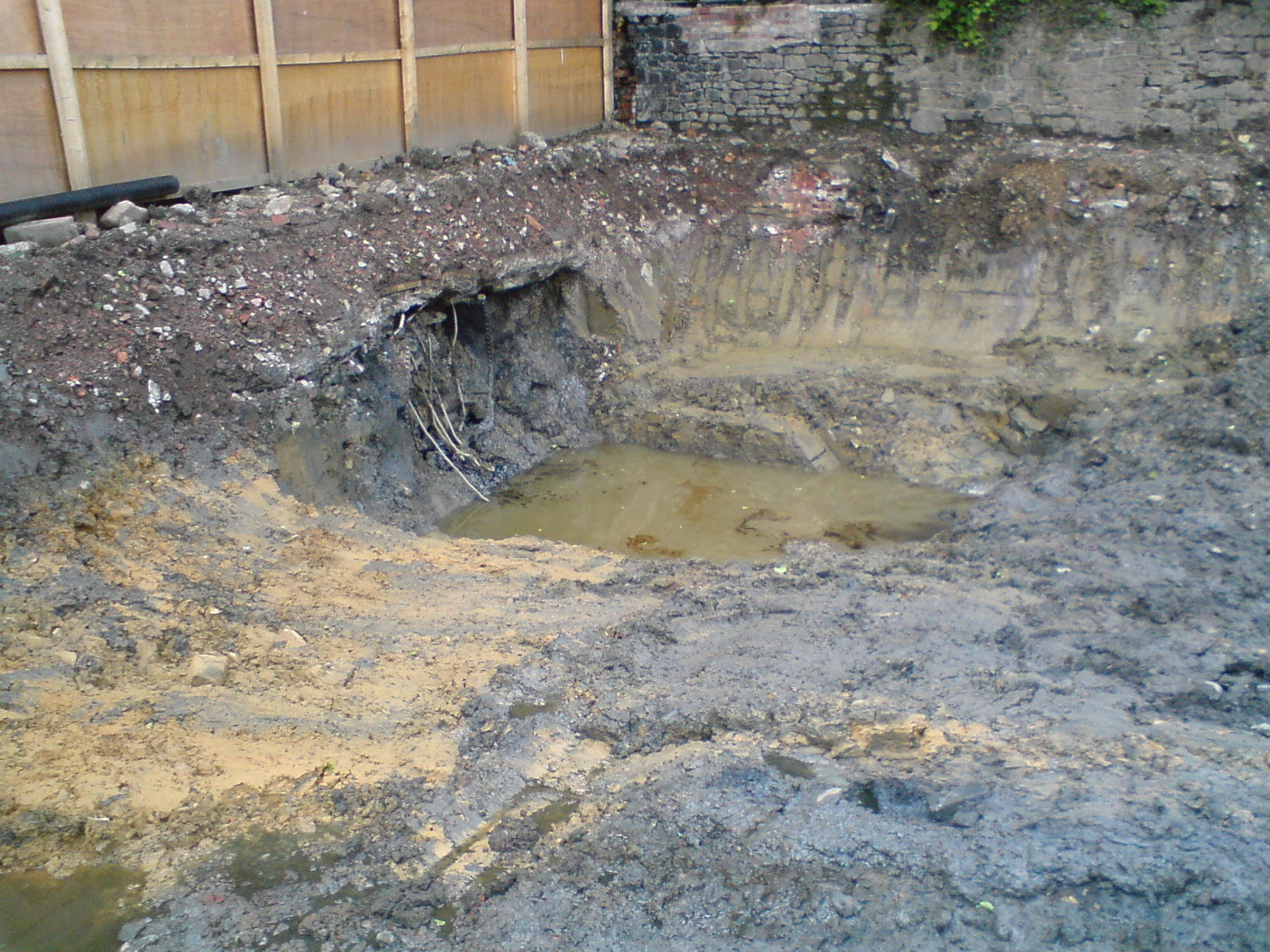
Example of brownfield land after excavation at a disused gasworks site, with soil contamination from removed underground storage tanks

Brownfield is previously developed land that has been abandoned or left underused, and which may carry pollution or a risk of pollution from previous industrial use. The definition varies and is decided by policy makers and land developers within different countries. The main difference in definitions of whether a piece of land is considered a brownfield or not depends on the presence or absence of pollution. Overall, brownfield land is a site previously developed for industrial or commercial purposes and thus requires further development before reuse.

Many contaminated post-industrial brownfield sites sit unused because the cleaning costs may be more than the land is worth after redevelopment. Previously unknown underground wastes can increase the cost for study and cleanup. Depending on the contaminants and damage present adaptive re-use and disposal of a brownfield can require advanced and specialized appraisal analysis techniques.

=== Mine tailings ===
In mining, tailings or tails are the materials left over after the process of separating the valuable fraction from the uneconomic fraction (gangue) of an ore. Tailings are different from overburden, which is the waste rock or other material that overlies an ore or mineral body and is displaced during mining without being processed. Waste valorization is the evaluation of waste and residues from an economic process in order to determine their value in reuse or recycling, as what was gangue at the time of separation may increase with time or more sophisticated recovery processes.

Tailings are likely to be dangerous sources of toxic chemicals such as heavy metals, sulfides, and in some cases radioactive content. These chemicals are especially dangerous when stored in water in ponds behind tailings dams. These ponds are also vulnerable to major breaches or leaks from the dams, causing environmental disasters, such as the Mount Polley disaster in British Columbia. Because of these and other environmental concerns such as groundwater leakage, toxic emissions and bird death, tailing piles and ponds have received more scrutiny, especially in developed countries, but the first UN-level standard for tailing management was only established in 2020.

=== Abandoned mines ===
An abandoned mine refers to a former mining or quarrying operation that is no longer in use and has no responsible entity to finance the cost of remediation and/or restoration of the mine feature or site. Such mines are typically left unattended and may pose safety hazards or cause environmental damage without proper maintenance. The term incorporates all types of old mines, including underground shaft mines and drift mines, and surface mines, including quarries and placer mining. Typically, the cost of addressing the mine's hazards is borne by the public/taxpayers/the government.An abandoned mine may be a hazard to health, safety or environment.

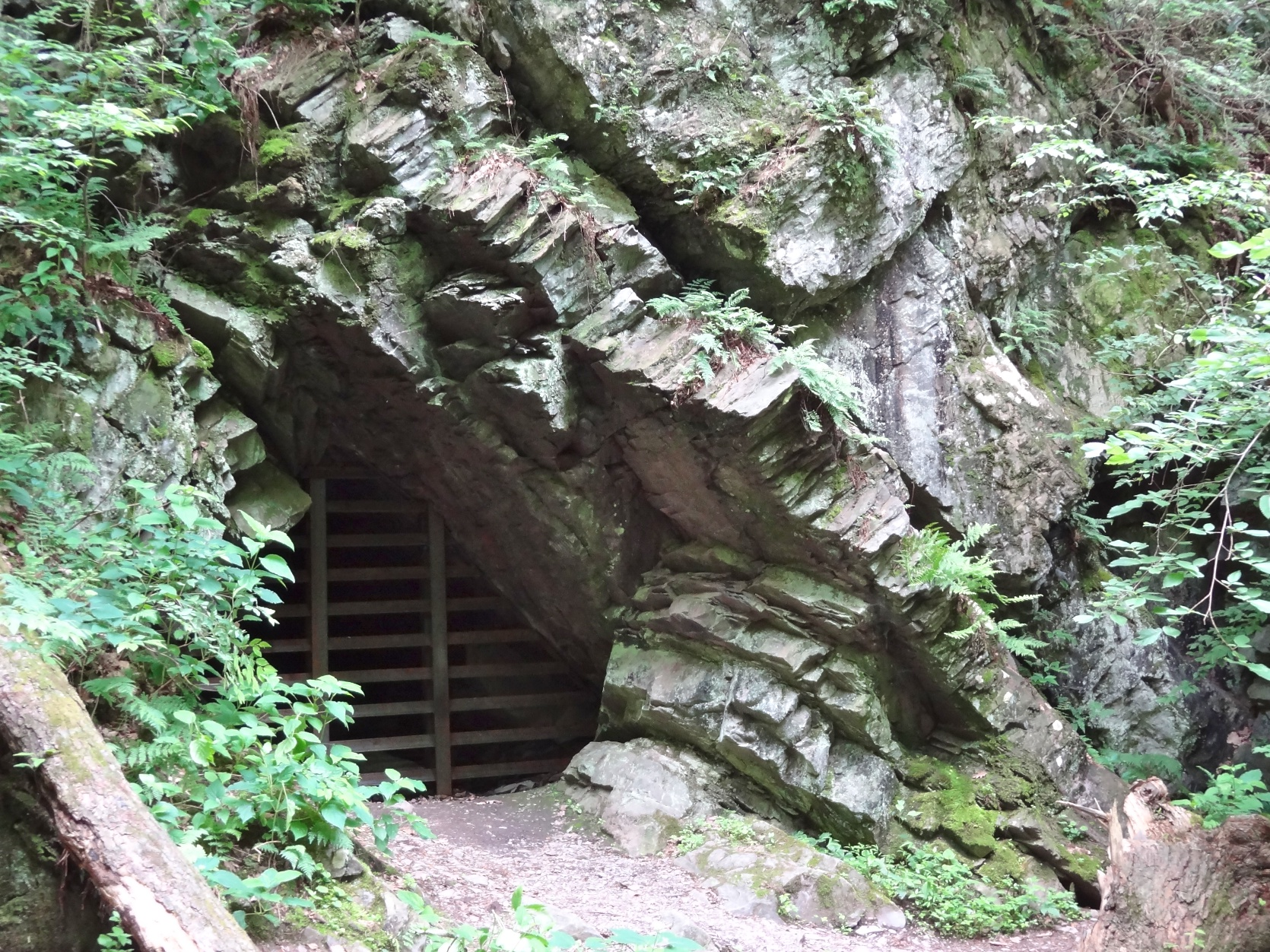
Pahaquarry Copper Mine adit, New Jersey, US

=== Abandoned gas wells ===
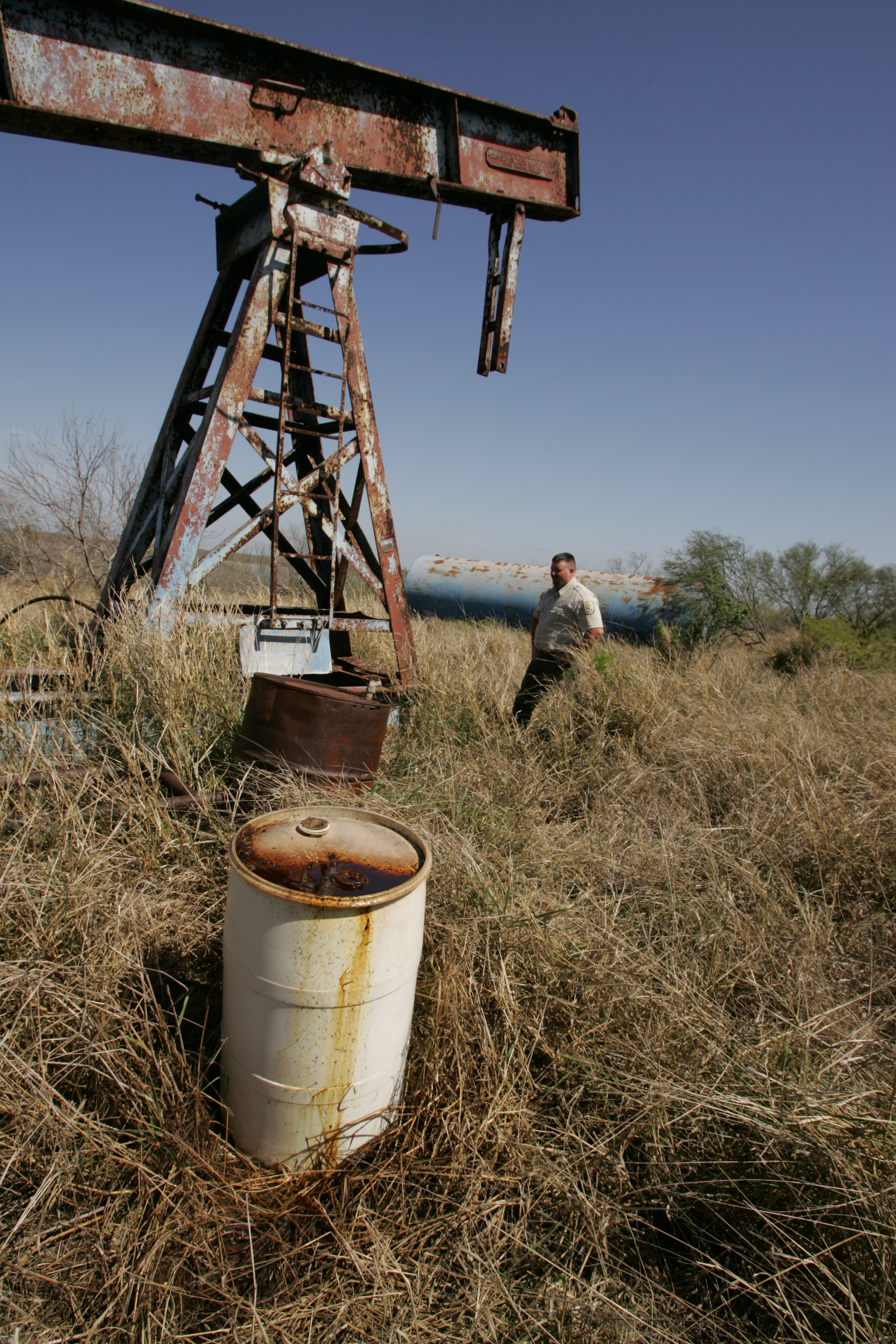
Abandoned oil well in the Lower Rio Grande Valley National Wildlife Refuge

Orphan, orphaned, or abandoned wells are oil or gas wells that have been abandoned by fossil fuel extraction industries. These wells may have been deactivated due to becoming uneconomic, failure to transfer ownerships (especially at bankruptcy of companies), or neglect, and thus no longer have legal owners responsible for their care. Decommissioning wells effectively can be expensive, costing several thousands of dollars for a shallow land well to millions of dollars for an offshore one. Thus the burden may fall on government agencies or surface landowners when a business entity can no longer be held responsible.

Orphan wells are a potent contributor of greenhouse gas emissions, such as methane emissions, contributing to climate change. Much of this leakage can be attributed to failure to have them plugged properly or leaking plugs. A 2020 estimate of abandoned wells in the United States was that methane emissions released from abandoned wells produced greenhouse gas impacts equivalent to three weeks of US oil consumption each year. The scale of leaking abandoned wells is well understood in the US and Canada because of public data and regulation; however, a Reuters investigation in 2020 could not find good estimates for Russia, Saudi Arabia and China—the next biggest oil and gas producers. However, they estimate there are 29 million abandoned wells internationally.

Abandoned wells have the potential to contaminate land, air and water, potentially harming ecosystems, wildlife, livestock, and humans. For example, many wells in the United States are situated on farmland, and if not maintained could contaminate soil and groundwater with toxic contaminants.

== Remediation ==
Human industrial activities can often lead to long-lasting pollutants in ecosystems. With industrialization and its consequences, technology has been developed to repair and detoxify the ecosystem. Some methods of remediation include natural bioremediation techniques that use plants and or microorganisms as well as Physical techniques like soil washing, vitrification, electrokinetic remediation, and permeable barrier systems are used to cleanse the ecosystem as well. Chemical remediation is another common method of detoxification in the ecosystem using methods like stabilization/solidification, precipitation, and ion-exchange resin.

Bioremediation and Legacy Pollutants

Bioremediation is a process that is typically used in detoxifying an ecosystem that is suffering from legacy pollutants. Microorganisms are typically the main biotechnology used in the process of removing heavy metals from contaminated sources. Common sources of heavy metal contamination from human actions includes cadmium, zinc, copper, nickel, and lead. Microbes employed in the process convert harmful heavy metals into non-toxic versions that are safer for the ecosystem. The process of using microbes is often considered one of the most safe, effective, and convenient methods of remediation due to the natural ability of native microbes to cleanse toxic products.

Physical Techniques in Remediation

Soil washing is a common method of remediation that has been well studied. It is most effective when used as a pair with other techniques like advanced oxidation or phytoremediation. The effectiveness of soil washing varies based on cleaning agents, pH levels, and the types of pollutants present. Vitrification has been studied, and shows potential for remediating large quantities of lead and zinc. In heat vitrification, bringing the material to roughly 1850 °C has been shown to effectively immobilize heavy-metals and non-volatile inorganic compounds. Electrokinetic remediation involves using electric currents to extract pollutants from the ecosystem, and is effective in the removal of radionuclides, heavy metals, and organic/inorganic material mixtures. For groundwater remediation, permeable barriers are commonly used to clean up pollution underground and aid in detoxification by using special materials.

Chemical Techniques in Remediation

Stabilization/solidification is a process that involves mixing waste with a binder to decrease its "leachability" which allows for safer disposal in landfills and other channels while changing its physical and chemical properties. Precipitation is another chemical remediation technique that involves making contaminates become solid particles by adding chemicals or microbes to form precipitates. Ion-exchange is another successful chemical remediation method that uses ion-exchange resins to remove pollutants from groundwater. Studies show success in the removal of cadmium, lead, and copper from contaminated groundwater.

Challenges and Strategies Managing Non-Point Source Pollution and "Hot Spots"

The management of non-point source pollution and identification of "hot spots" are pivotal in addressing legacy pollution. Tackling these issues requires a comprehensive understanding of pollution sources and the implementation of targeted management practices. Innovative strategies, such as the application of technology for monitoring and remediation, play a crucial role in mitigating the impacts of legacy pollutants on ecosystems and human health.

== Social impacts ==
Environmental Justice and Legacy Pollution

Legacy pollution disproportionately affects marginalized communities, including people of color, Indigenous populations, and low-income areas. Studies show that these communities are more likely to live near polluted sites and face higher health and safety risks. An environmental justice approach is critical, emphasizing the importance of equitable cleanup efforts and recognizing the right to a healthy environment for all individuals.

=== Social Impacts Globally ===
DDT Usage

DDT was a popular pesticide from the 1960s to the 1980s that was used intensely to kill mosquitos. The United States banned the pesticide in 1972, largely in part because of a movement started by Rachel Carson and the book Silent Spring. The book, published in 1962, drastically changed how scientists conducted their research and increased focus on the impacts of humans on the environment. The persistent usage of DDT led to resistance by many of the pests it was actively supposed to kill.

=== Social Impacts in Canada ===
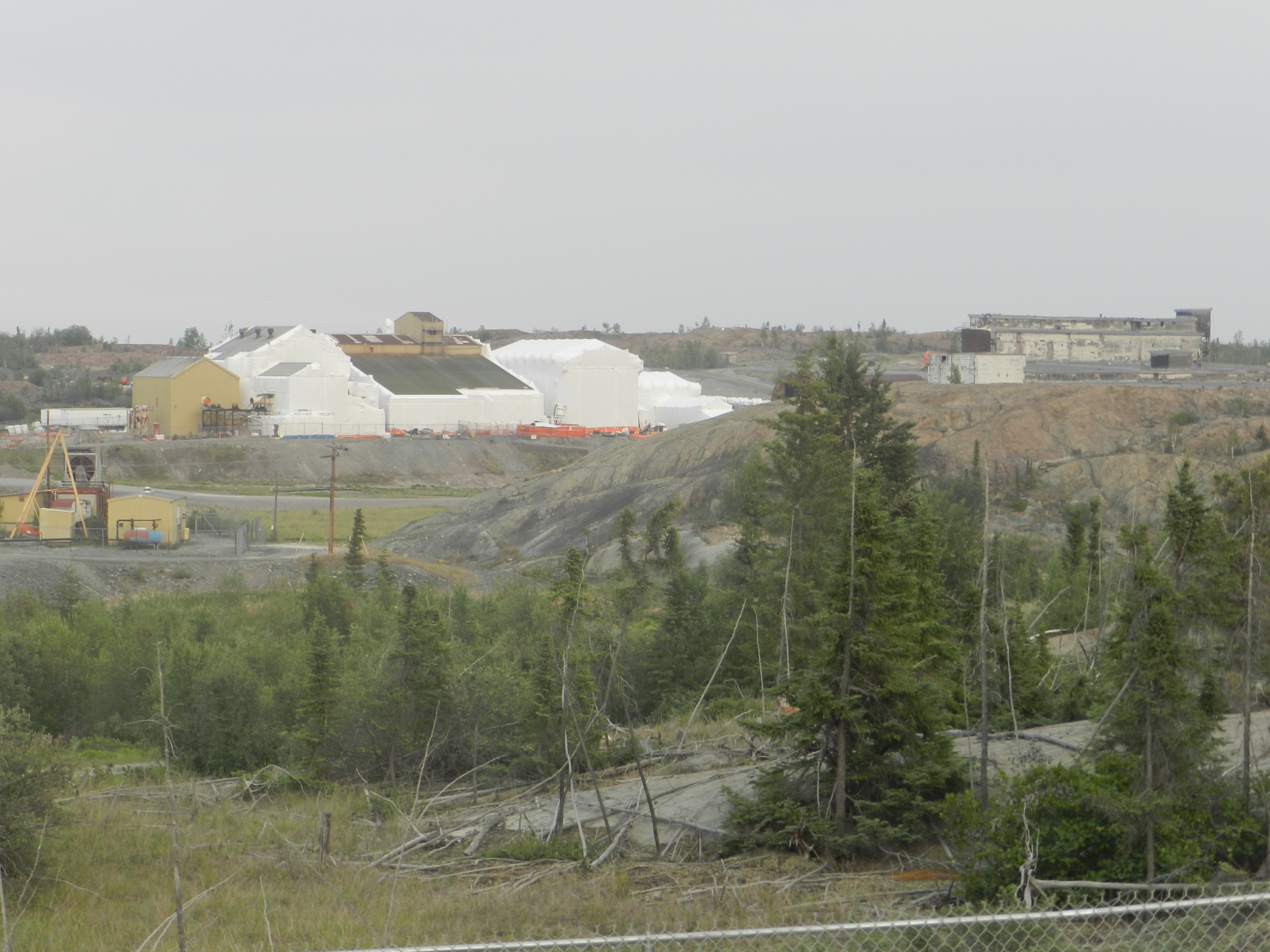
The Giant Mine site while undergoing a remediation project.

Giant Mine, Northwest Territories, Canada.

The Giant Mine was a large gold mine that was predominately active during the period of 1949-1999. During this period, approximately 20,000 tonnes of arsenic was released at the site. The mine was owned by the company Royal Oak Mines until 1999. The mine went bankrupt and ownership was transferred to the federal and territorial governments. In the process of operations, ore roasting is a commonly used practice for gold recovery. The Giant Mine used ore Roasting as a method of gold recovery primarily, and with this method of use came the release of large amounts of arsenic. Ore roasting is impactful to toxicity levels of arsenic, increases the solubility, and increases its rate of Bioaccessibility. Studies have shown that underground chambers at the site contain approximately 237,000 tonnes of arsenic trioxide dust. This has led to arsenic concentrations exceeding 4000 parts per million (ppm) without accounting other sources of arsenic sources and sinks that are present in the area that further contaminate the region. Local Metis populations have given statements regarding the former mine site stating that their land, fish, and water are all contaminated from legacy pollution caused by the site. a representative of the community stated that cancer rates in his community have risen due to the legacy pollution still impacting the local community.

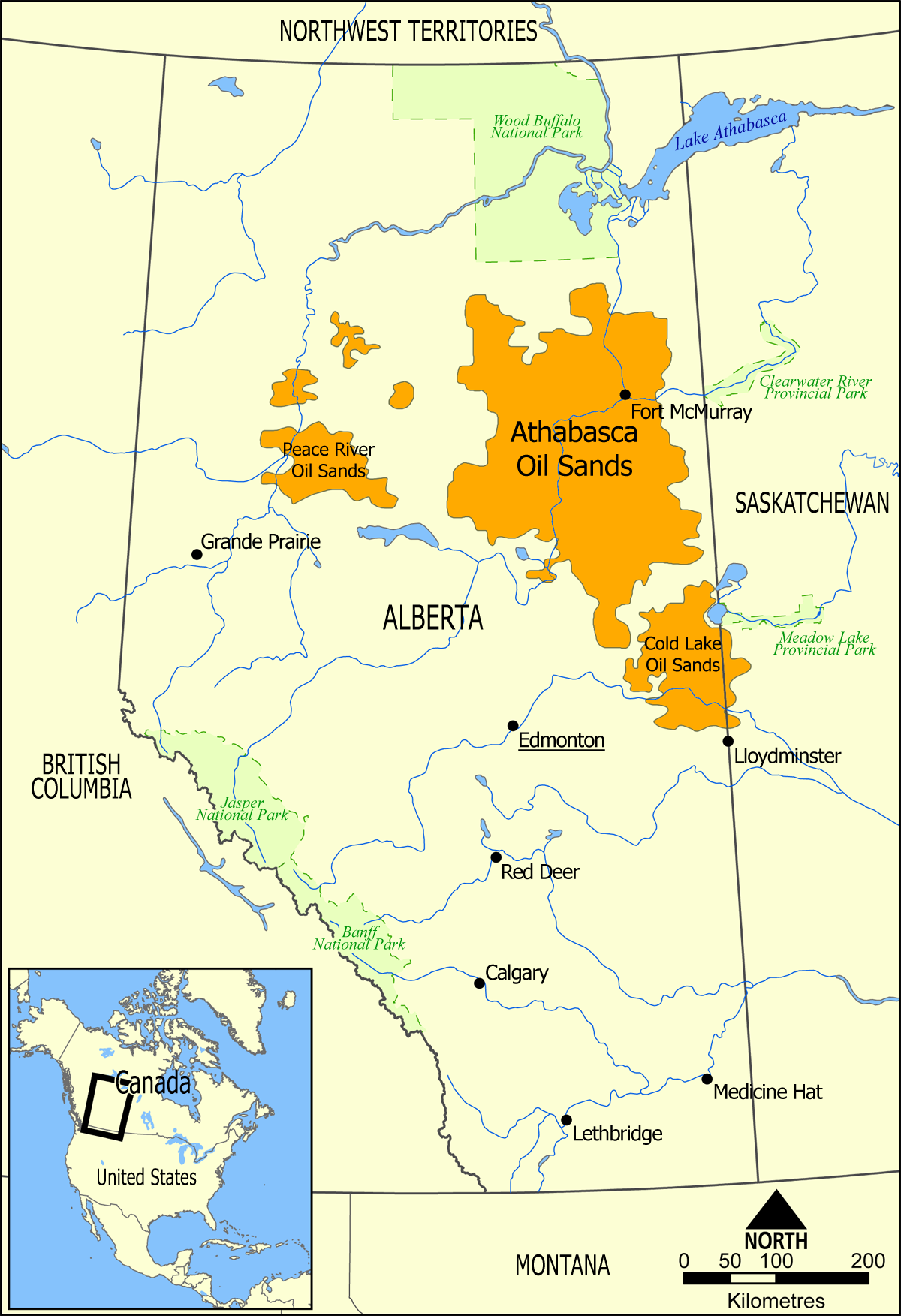
The Athabasca River runs directly through the highlighted orange Athabasca Oil Sands region.

Athabasca River, Alberta, Canada.

With the development and expansion of oil sand operations in the region of the Athabasca River, concerns have been raised regarding higher cancer rates in local residents due to pollutants from tailing ponds. Evidence of mercury, nickel, thallium, and all 13 priority pollutants were discovered in nearby area samples throughout various seasons in the year varying in concentration. First Nations populations that are reliant on local foods have been found to be directly exposed to Benzo(a)pyrene (BaP) as a result of oil sands operations. Fish from the area are the most significant contributors to BaP exposure in the communities, leading to BaP intake levels that rival on average nine cigarettes a day. Levels are anticipated to grow along with industrial expansion in the region.

Case Studies: Giant Mine and Athabasca River

The Giant Mine in Canada's Northwest Territories and the Athabasca River in Alberta serve as stark reminders of the social and environmental impacts of legacy pollution. The Giant Mine, with its history of arsenic pollution, and the Athabasca River, affected by oil sand operations, illustrate the dire consequences of industrial activities on local communities, particularly on Indigenous populations. These case studies underscore the urgency of cleanup efforts and the need for ongoing vigilance to protect human health and the environment.

=== Chernobyl Nuclear Disaster, Ukraine ===
Chernobyl Accident, 1986

Chernobyl radiation map from 1996, ten years after the initial disaster.

The Chernobyl disaster occurred on April 26, 1986, at the Chernobyl Nuclear Power Plant in Ukraine. An explosion and fire released large quantities of radioactive isotopes into the atmosphere, which spread over much of Europe. The immediate aftermath involved acute radiation sickness and deaths among plant workers and emergency responders. Long-term health effects, including thyroid cancer, leukemia, and other cancers, have been observed in thousands of individuals exposed to radiation. The disaster also led to the permanent displacement of over 300,000 people from their homes, creating profound social and psychological impacts and a legacy of health and economic hardships.

=== Bhopal Gas Tragedy, India ===
Bhopal Disaster, 1984

On the night of December 2 to 3, 1984, a pesticide plant owned by Union Carbide in Bhopal, India, released 42 tons of methyl isocyanate gas. Exposure to the gas killed thousands immediately, and many more succumbed to related illnesses in the following weeks. Survivors suffer from chronic respiratory problems, eye irritations, and skin diseases. The incident has also resulted in genetic disorders and birth defects in subsequent generations. The social fallout includes ongoing litigation for fair compensation, lack of adequate medical facilities for the affected, and persistent economic stagnation in the community.

== Most common legacy pollutants and health hazards ==
The most common legacy pollutants found in the natural environment are lead, arsenic, bromate, brominated flame retardants (BFR's), chlorinated naphthalenes, dioxins and dioxin-like compounds, mercury, and PCBs.

Lead

High levels of lead in human blood is detrimental to the health of individuals at all ages. In children and infants, high levels of lead can contribute to behavioural changes, reduce cognitive performance, impact postnatal growth at all stages and delaying puberty, and can directly impact hearing capacity of the individual. Adults suffer from the impacts of lead toxicity as well. Adults can face severe health hazards including cardiovascular disease, central nervous system disorders, kidney issues, and fertility issues. In pregnancy, lead exposure can result in issues regarding fetal growth.

Arsenic

The exposure of humans to arsenic occurs through air, water, food, and soil Arsenic is distributed through the body in organs like the liver, kidney, and lungs. Arsenic can also accumulate in bodily tissues like hair, nails, and skin. Arsenic has been classified as a Group 1 carcinogen by the International Agency for Research on Cancer. Other effects on the human body includes endocrine disruption, neuropathic and neurobehavioral issues, reproductive issues, cardiovascular disease, and respiratory related issues.

Bromate

Consumption of high levels of bromate poses a risk for cancer when exceeding the maximum contaminant limit (MCL). This limit is established at an international scale for many countries.

Chlorinated Naphthalenes

A historical incident occurred during World War II that lead to greater understanding of the impact of chlorinated naphthalenes (PCNs) on human health. A product containing PCNs was consumed by individuals at the time, and led to symptoms of gastrointestinal disruption, neuropathy, depression, and chloracne. Regular exposure of PCNs by cable workers, assemblers, and labourers, has led to fatalities.

Dioxin and dioxin-like compounds

Dioxin and similar compounds are placed among the most toxic chemicals know to the public. Dioxins are recognized as a carcinogen at an international scale. Dioxin exposure can also lead to atherosclerosis, hypertension, and diabetes. Disruption to the nervous system, immune system, reproductive system, and endocrine system are all impacts of long term exposure to dioxins and dioxin-like compounds. Short term exposure to dioxin leads to a condition known as chloracne. Fetuses and infants are very sensitive to dioxin exposure, and can suffer very harmful effects.

Mercury

The impact of mercury pollution is extensive in regard to human health. While mercury occurs naturally and is released through erosion and volcanic activity, human related activities like smelting and industrial production increase the risk to exposure. Mercury related diseases are noted and well studied. Food related outbreaks have been devastating to many communities in developing countries, and has resulted in a high number of deaths. Mercury poisoning can cause severe issues to the human nervous system, cause neurological disorders, create organ related issues, and result in immune system issues. Mercury exposure can also lead to cancer risk, and birth defects.

Polychlorinated Biphenyls (PCBs)

PCBs are a confirmed carcinogen that is very harmful to human health. A study on a husband and wife who faced PCBs as an occupational hazard suffered from and developed thyroid cancer, and malignant melanoma. The husband was a non-smoker and developed lung cancer due to exposure. Residents in close proximity to PCB contamination sites face higher rates of cardiovascular disease, hypertension, diabetes, and reduced cognitive ability.

== International policy ==
The Stockholm Convention on Persistent Organic Pollutants is one of the main international mechanisms for supporting the elimination of legacy persistent organic pollutants such as PCBs.

Global Efforts Against Legacy Pollution

Comparing approaches to managing legacy pollution across different countries highlights the variety of strategies employed worldwide. While some nations have advanced regulatory frameworks and technologies for pollution control, others struggle due to limited resources and infrastructure. International cooperation, such as through the Stockholm Convention on Persistent Organic Pollutants, is essential for the global elimination of legacy pollutants and the sharing of best practices .

== Recent Efforts in U.S. Legislation ==
Recent efforts within the U.S. on remediation of superfund sites can be seen across the nation. In 2023, the EPA deleted four sites from the National Priorities List, allowing for further development of the remediated land due to the completion of the clean-up.

Bipartisan Infrastructure Law in the U.S.

The Bipartisan Infrastructure Law in the U.S., signed by President Joe Biden, is an investment in the country. It allocates funds to multifaceted infrastructure needs and will directly invest in communities focusing on environmental justice, climate change, and economic growth.

In a historic move to tackle legacy pollution, the Biden Administration's Bipartisan Infrastructure Law allocates $16 billion towards the cleanup of abandoned mine lands and orphaned oil and gas wells. This funding represents the largest investment in addressing legacy pollution in American history, aiming to mitigate environmental hazards, protect public health, and revitalize affected communities.

By aiding in legacy pollution remediation, the law will greatly improve the disparities among communities, decreasing the social impacts. With one in four Black and Hispanic Americans living within 3 miles of a superfund site, the law will deliver investments to clean those superfund sites up and reclaim the land. Creating jobs and addressing legacy pollution, the Bipartisan infrastructure law will remediate environmental harm and advance overdue environmental justice.

== See also ==
- History of environmental pollution
