= C10H10N2 =

The molecular formula C_{10}H_{10}N_{2} (molar mass: 158.20 g/mol, exact mass: 158.0844 u) may refer to:

- 1,5-Diaminonaphthalene
- 1,8-Diaminonaphthalene
- Nicotyrine
- Phemerazole
