= Bromonaphthalene =

Bromonaphthalene may refer to:

- 1-Bromonaphthalene
- 2-Bromonaphthalene
