= Polychlorinated naphthalene =

- General structure of polychlorinated naphthalenes

Identifiers
CAS Number	70776-03-3
ECHA InfoCard	100.068.038
CompTox Dashboard (EPA)	DTXSID60103485

Properties
Chemical formula	C_{10}H_{8−x}Cl_{x}
Molar mass	Variable
- Except where otherwise noted, data are given for materials in their standard state (at 25 °C [77 °F], 100 kPa). Infobox references

Structure of 2,3,6,7-Tetrachloronaphthalene

Polychlorinated naphthalene (PCN) are the products obtained upon treatment of naphthalene with chlorine. The generic chemical formula is C_{10}H_{8−(m+n)}Cl_{(m+n)}. Commercial PCNs are mixtures of up to 75 components and byproducts. The material is an oil or a waxy solid, depending on the degree of chlorination. PCNs were once used in insulating coatings for electrical wires, as well as other applications, but their use has been largely phased out.

== Chemical structure of PCN congeners ==
There are 75 different PCN congeners.

number	formula	name	CAS Number	InChIKey
PCN-1	C_{10}H_{7}Cl	1-chloronaphthalene	90-13-1	JTPNRXUCIXHOKM-UHFFFAOYSA-N
PCN-2	C_{10}H_{7}Cl	2-chloronaphthalene	91-58-7	CGYGETOMCSJHJU-UHFFFAOYSA-N
PCN-3	C_{10}H_{6}Cl_{2}	1,2-dichloronaphthalene	2050-69-3	MOXLHAPKZWTHEX-UHFFFAOYSA-N
PCN-4	C_{10}H_{6}Cl_{2}	1,3-dichloronaphthalene	2198-75-6	AMCBMCWLCDERHY-UHFFFAOYSA-N
PCN-5	C_{10}H_{6}Cl_{2}	1,4-dichloronaphthalene	1825-31-6	JDPKCYMVSKDOGS-UHFFFAOYSA-N
PCN-6	C_{10}H_{6}Cl_{2}	1,5-dichloronaphthalene	1825-30-5	ZBQZXTBAGBTUAD-UHFFFAOYSA-N
PCN-7	C_{10}H_{6}Cl_{2}	1,6-dichloronaphthalene	2050-72-8	CEDZMDSZTVUPSP-UHFFFAOYSA-N
PCN-8	C_{10}H_{6}Cl_{2}	1,7-dichloronaphthalene	2050-73-9	VQBIYCQGHAHVPN-UHFFFAOYSA-N
PCN-9	C_{10}H_{6}Cl_{2}	1,8-dichloronaphthalene	2050-74-0	ADRYPAGQXFMVFP-UHFFFAOYSA-N
PCN-10	C_{10}H_{6}Cl_{2}	2,3-dichloronaphthalene	2050-75-1	SKGXUFZRYNGFJS-UHFFFAOYSA-N
PCN-11	C_{10}H_{6}Cl_{2}	2,6-dichloronaphthalene	2065-70-5	YCFUHBHONRJFHI-UHFFFAOYSA-N
PCN-12	C_{10}H_{6}Cl_{2}	2,7-dichloronaphthalene	2198-77-8	DWBQZSYTSNYEEJ-UHFFFAOYSA-N
PCN-13	C_{10}H_{5}Cl_{3}	1,2,3-trichloronaphthalene	50402-52-3	QEPTXDCPBXMWJC-UHFFFAOYSA-N
PCN-14	C_{10}H_{5}Cl_{3}	1,2,4-trichloronaphthalene	50402-51-2	MRJBOPVWPORBKZ-UHFFFAOYSA-N
PCN-15	C_{10}H_{5}Cl_{3}	1,2,5-trichloronaphthalene	55720-33-7	MMHZKSMAFILONG-UHFFFAOYSA-N
PCN-16	C_{10}H_{5}Cl_{3}	1,2,6-trichloronaphthalene	51570-44-6	AAUJSCRITBXDJH-UHFFFAOYSA-N
PCN-17	C_{10}H_{5}Cl_{3}	1,2,7-trichloronaphthalene	55720-34-8	QYYUVUXSJZJCLQ-UHFFFAOYSA-N
PCN-18	C_{10}H_{5}Cl_{3}	1,2,8-trichloronaphthalene	55720-35-9	YSFLKFZEQBZEPU-UHFFFAOYSA-N
PCN-19	C_{10}H_{5}Cl_{3}	1,3,5-trichloronaphthalene	51570-43-5	DZHZYPCCEISGSQ-UHFFFAOYSA-N
PCN-20	C_{10}H_{5}Cl_{3}	1,3,6-trichloronaphthalene	55720-36-0	CJRUXWSXMDPLDQ-UHFFFAOYSA-N
PCN-21	C_{10}H_{5}Cl_{3}	1,3,7-trichloronaphthalene	55720-37-1	CFEUGIGSIREATC-UHFFFAOYSA-N
PCN-22	C_{10}H_{5}Cl_{3}	1,3,8-trichloronaphthalene	55720-38-2	AXNCYYJNXAOOJQ-UHFFFAOYSA-N
PCN-23	C_{10}H_{5}Cl_{3}	1,4,5-trichloronaphthalene	2437-55-0	VQSNXLCFFHGXTI-UHFFFAOYSA-N
PCN-24	C_{10}H_{5}Cl_{3}	1,4,6-trichloronaphthalene	2437-54-9	RLTTZFDRZKJVKJ-UHFFFAOYSA-N
PCN-25	C_{10}H_{5}Cl_{3}	1,6,7-trichloronaphthalene	55720-39-3	FUEZTEBYLIMNHN-UHFFFAOYSA-N
PCN-26	C_{10}H_{5}Cl_{3}	2,3,6-trichloronaphthalene	55720-40-6	ZYTLBFKRYKUCMJ-UHFFFAOYSA-N
PCN-27	C_{10}H_{4}Cl_{4}	1,2,3,4-tetrachloronaphthalene	20020-02-4	NAQWICRLNQSPPW-UHFFFAOYSA-N
PCN-28	C_{10}H_{4}Cl_{4}	1,2,3,5-tetrachloronaphthalene	53555-63-8	HJJKSUVYCQAMBG-UHFFFAOYSA-N
PCN-29	C_{10}H_{4}Cl_{4}	1,2,3,6-tetrachloronaphthalene	149864-78-8	ZVORWIZONZUEEI-UHFFFAOYSA-N
PCN-30	C_{10}H_{4}Cl_{4}	1,2,3,7-tetrachloronaphthalene	55720-41-7	AULMCNDOHMTPGC-UHFFFAOYSA-N
PCN-31	C_{10}H_{4}Cl_{4}	1,2,3,8-tetrachloronaphthalene	149864-81-3	UVMHXYSILPJXPK-UHFFFAOYSA-N
PCN-32	C_{10}H_{4}Cl_{4}	1,2,4,5-tetrachloronaphthalene	6733-54-6	BIVDISPRSYAHQQ-UHFFFAOYSA-N
PCN-33	C_{10}H_{4}Cl_{4}	1,2,4,6-tetrachloronaphthalene	51570-45-7	GLVVZPZGCNEVEM-UHFFFAOYSA-N
PCN-34	C_{10}H_{4}Cl_{4}	1,2,4,7-tetrachloronaphthalene	67922-21-8	PWXOBMRJWBBEED-UHFFFAOYSA-N
PCN-35	C_{10}H_{4}Cl_{4}	1,2,4,8-tetrachloronaphthalene	6529-87-9	WCMSFBRREKZZFL-UHFFFAOYSA-N
PCN-36	C_{10}H_{4}Cl_{4}	1,2,5,6-tetrachloronaphthalene	67922-22-9	ZPUUGNBIWHBXBM-UHFFFAOYSA-N
PCN-37	C_{10}H_{4}Cl_{4}	1,2,5,7-tetrachloronaphthalene	67922-23-0	KQZUIOXHRIVQGR-UHFFFAOYSA-N
PCN-38	C_{10}H_{4}Cl_{4}	1,2,5,8-tetrachloronaphthalene	149864-80-2	DLTBLLHAQLBHDR-UHFFFAOYSA-N
PCN-39	C_{10}H_{4}Cl_{4}	1,2,6,7-tetrachloronaphthalene	149864-79-9	AXLIBZIJTKPCHR-UHFFFAOYSA-N
PCN-40	C_{10}H_{4}Cl_{4}	1,2,6,8-tetrachloronaphthalene	67922-24-1	OVAYDYKVLHHIDQ-UHFFFAOYSA-N
PCN-41	C_{10}H_{4}Cl_{4}	1,2,7,8-tetrachloronaphthalene	149864-82-4	DARLUNVQYCQWRW-UHFFFAOYSA-N
PCN-42	C_{10}H_{4}Cl_{4}	1,3,5,7-tetrachloronaphthalene	53555-64-9	OTTCXKPQKOLSJN-UHFFFAOYSA-N
PCN-43	C_{10}H_{4}Cl_{4}	1,3,5,8-tetrachloronaphthalene	31604-28-1	VFTLNRFRXWCJJK-UHFFFAOYSA-N
PCN-44	C_{10}H_{4}Cl_{4}	1,3,6,7-tetrachloronaphthalene	55720-42-8	BULBRUKKSUUPNT-UHFFFAOYSA-N
PCN-45	C_{10}H_{4}Cl_{4}	1,3,6,8-tetrachloronaphthalene	150224-15-0	XXWQPOHDPJIYIN-UHFFFAOYSA-N
PCN-46	C_{10}H_{4}Cl_{4}	1,4,5,8-tetrachloronaphthalene	3432-57-3	LITCKAVLJAKHOE-UHFFFAOYSA-N
PCN-47	C_{10}H_{4}Cl_{4}	1,4,6,7-tetrachloronaphthalene	55720-43-9	VJZRCIYSYVGDMU-UHFFFAOYSA-N
PCN-48	C_{10}H_{4}Cl_{4}	2,3,6,7-tetrachloronaphthalene	34588-40-4	XTTLUUBHRXWFSZ-UHFFFAOYSA-N
PCN-49	C_{10}H_{3}Cl_{5}	1,2,3,4,5-pentachloronaphthalene	67922-25-2	JRZKNHITLINYHV-UHFFFAOYSA-N
PCN-50	C_{10}H_{3}Cl_{5}	1,2,3,4,6-pentachloronaphthalene	67922-26-3	BAOLNVSMVTYGDA-UHFFFAOYSA-N
PCN-51	C_{10}H_{3}Cl_{5}	1,2,3,5,6-pentachloronaphthalene	150224-18-3	CHADMNIGNFLQOI-UHFFFAOYSA-N
PCN-52	C_{10}H_{3}Cl_{5}	1,2,3,5,7-pentachloronaphthalene	53555-65-0	OVSKLQPHXHPXDR-UHFFFAOYSA-N
PCN-53	C_{10}H_{3}Cl_{5}	1,2,3,5,8-pentachloronaphthalene	150224-24-1	HVYRFNJXZVEGFK-UHFFFAOYSA-N
PCN-54	C_{10}H_{3}Cl_{5}	1,2,3,6,7-pentachloronaphthalene	150224-16-1	MKCASBPTHPJCDC-UHFFFAOYSA-N
PCN-55	C_{10}H_{3}Cl_{5}	1,2,3,6,8-pentachloronaphthalene	150224-23-0	NMAMEWIQKMFSSI-UHFFFAOYSA-N
PCN-56	C_{10}H_{3}Cl_{5}	1,2,3,7,8-pentachloronaphthalene	150205-21-3	BFRRJXVSQTZQHM-UHFFFAOYSA-N
PCN-57	C_{10}H_{3}Cl_{5}	1,2,4,5,6-pentachloronaphthalene	150224-20-7	KPOZENRUJCHWOA-UHFFFAOYSA-N
PCN-58	C_{10}H_{3}Cl_{5}	1,2,4,5,7-pentachloronaphthalene	150224-19-4	WYLDWCYZCFRVRH-UHFFFAOYSA-N
PCN-59	C_{10}H_{3}Cl_{5}	1,2,4,5,8-pentachloronaphthalene	150224-25-2	FEIKEVSWLMYFFF-UHFFFAOYSA-N
PCN-60	C_{10}H_{3}Cl_{5}	1,2,4,6,7-pentachloronaphthalene	150224-17-2	GXQUDLBNLKOIQB-UHFFFAOYSA-N
PCN-61	C_{10}H_{3}Cl_{5}	1,2,4,6,8-pentachloronaphthalene	150224-22-9	HGSDQSUMXKHGTH-UHFFFAOYSA-N
PCN-62	C_{10}H_{3}Cl_{5}	1,2,4,7,8-pentachloronaphthalene	150224-21-8	LBCOXKFWBDTJTF-UHFFFAOYSA-N
PCN-63	C_{10}H_{2}Cl_{6}	1,2,3,4,5,6-hexachloronaphthalene	58877-88-6	CTLMCQOGOWNFHA-UHFFFAOYSA-N
PCN-64	C_{10}H_{2}Cl_{6}	1,2,3,4,5,7-hexachloronaphthalene	67922-27-4	SWRNUKWDDYPZGV-UHFFFAOYSA-N
PCN-65	C_{10}H_{2}Cl_{6}	1,2,3,4,5,8-hexachloronaphthalene	103426-93-3	PGCDNPCENWGYMA-UHFFFAOYSA-N
PCN-66	C_{10}H_{2}Cl_{6}	1,2,3,4,6,7-hexachloronaphthalene	103426-96-6	ZRNSVEOEIWQEMU-UHFFFAOYSA-N
PCN-67	C_{10}H_{2}Cl_{6}	1,2,3,5,6,7-hexachloronaphthalene	103426-97-7	XZLJCGGEQLNWDT-UHFFFAOYSA-N
PCN-68	C_{10}H_{2}Cl_{6}	1,2,3,5,6,8-hexachloronaphthalene	103426-95-5	FQELOCOACCYGLL-UHFFFAOYSA-N
PCN-69	C_{10}H_{2}Cl_{6}	1,2,3,5,7,8-hexachloronaphthalene	103426-94-4	JPQLLIUTUFJWMH-UHFFFAOYSA-N
PCN-70	C_{10}H_{2}Cl_{6}	1,2,3,6,7,8-hexachloronaphthalene	17062-87-2	WJYZNPLWZGYFIE-UHFFFAOYSA-N
PCN-71	C_{10}H_{2}Cl_{6}	1,2,4,5,6,8-hexachloronaphthalene	90948-28-0	JHKLUUFTHIWTKX-UHFFFAOYSA-N
PCN-72	C_{10}H_{2}Cl_{6}	1,2,4,5,7,8-hexachloronaphthalene	103426-92-2	SFZREMCYQNYZMZ-UHFFFAOYSA-N
PCN-73	C_{10}HCl_{7}	1,2,3,4,5,6,7-heptachloronaphthalene	58863-14-2	NDZIBNJHNBUHKW-UHFFFAOYSA-N
PCN-74	C_{10}HCl_{7}	1,2,3,4,5,6,8-heptachloronaphthalene	58863-15-3	QYEGXUUXWMKHHS-UHFFFAOYSA-N
PCN-75	C_{10}Cl_{8}	octachloronaphthalene	2234-13-1	RTNLUFLDZOAXIC-UHFFFAOYSA-N

== Production ==
PCNs started to be produced for high-volume uses around 1910 in both Europe and the United States. In Europe the largest volume products were called Nibren waxes, made in Germany by Bayer. Other European PCN tradenames included Seekay (UK, from ICI), Clonacire (France), Cerifal (Italy) and Woskol (Poland). In the United States, the largest volume PCN products were called Halowax, from a New York company of the same name that was later owned by Union Carbide and then taken over by Koppers of Pittsburgh, PA, now Beazer East. Although trace amounts of PCNs may be released by natural processes such as wildfires, their industrial uses increased the apparent rates of accumulation in the environment by factors of 10,000 or more.

== Safety ==
After about 20 years of commercial production, health hazards began to be reported in workers exposed to PCNs: chloracne, severe skin rashes and liver disease that led to deaths of workers. A conference about the hazards was organized at Harvard School of Public Health in 1937, and several more publications dealing with PCN hazards appeared before 1940. PCNs containing three or more chlorines per molecule have typically been found more hazardous than those with fewer, but as the maximum of eight is approached, hazards appear to decrease.

There was a lag of about 40 years between disclosure of PCN hazards and government regulation. In the U.S. exposure to PCNs was drastically reduced after 1976, following enactment of the Toxic Substances Control Act. Major equipment manufacturers banned PCNs in their products, and major PCN producers discontinued operations. By 1983 worldwide PCN production had almost halted except for small amounts used in testing and research. DuPont produced a synthetic rubber, Neoprene FB, made in Northern Ireland using pentachloronaphthalene.

Increased cancer risks have been suspected but so far not shown. Current concerns about PCNs include their release as byproducts of waste incineration.

== Bioaccumulation ==
In 2013, the 9th meeting of the Persistent Organic Pollutants Review Committee, established under the Stockholm Convention on Persistent Organic Pollutants proposed di-,tri-,tetra-,penta-,hexa-, hepta- and octa-chlorinated naphthalenes, for listing in Annexes A and C to that Convention.

While some PCNs can be broken down by sunlight and, at slow rates, by certain microorganisms, many PCNs persist in the environment. After more than 80 years of use and total production of several hundred thousand tons, PCN residues are widespread.

== See also ==
- 1-Chloronaphthalene
- 2-Chloronaphthalene

== Literature ==
- Eva Jakobsson, Lillemor Asplund: Polychlorinated Naphthalenes (PCNs), in The Handbook of Environmental Chemistry, Volume 3K, 2000, p. 97–126, ISBN 978-3-540-65838-2, doi:10.1007/3-540-48915-0_5
