= C10H7Cl =

The molecular formula C_{10}H_{7}Cl (molar mass: 162.62 g/mol, exact mass: 162.0236 u) may refer to:

- 1-Chloronaphthalene
- 2-Chloronaphthalene
