= 1,5-Diaminonaphthalene =

Names
- Preferred IUPAC name Naphthalene-1,5-diamine
- Other names Alphamin, 1,5-DAN

Identifiers
CAS Number	2243-62-1
3D model (JSmol)	Interactive image
ChEBI	CHEBI:53003
ChEMBL	ChEMBL538965
ChemSpider	15851
ECHA InfoCard	100.017.108
EC Number	218-817-8
KEGG	C19463
PubChem CID	16720
RTECS number	QJ3400000
UNII	13PD3J52LK
UN number	3077
CompTox Dashboard (EPA)	DTXSID3020916
- InChI: InChI=1S/C10H10N2/c11-9-5-1-3-7-8(9)4-2-6-10(7)12/h1-6H,11-12H2 Key: KQSABULTKYLFEV-UHFFFAOYSA-N
- SMILES: C1=CC2=C(C=CC=C2N)C(=C1)N

Properties
Chemical formula	C_{10}H_{10}N_{2}
Molar mass	158.204 g·mol^{−1}
Appearance	white solid
Density	1.4
Melting point	185–187 °C (365–369 °F; 458–460 K)

Structure
Crystal structure	monoclinic
Space group	P2_{1}/c
Lattice constant	a = 5.1790, b = 11.008, c = 21.238 α = 90°, β = 90.68°, γ = 90°
Lattice volume (V)	1210.7
Formula units (Z)	6

Hazards
- GHS labelling
Pictograms	(GHS08: Health hazard) (GHS09: Environmental hazard)
Signal word	Warning
Hazard statements	H351, H410
Precautionary statements	P201, P202, P273, P281, P308+P313, P391, P405, P501
Flash point	226 °C (439 °F; 499 K)
- Except where otherwise noted, data are given for materials in their standard state (at 25 °C [77 °F], 100 kPa). Infobox references

1,5-Diaminonaphthalene is an organic compound with the formula C_{10}H_{6}(NH_{2})_{2}. It is one of several diaminonaphthalenes. It is a colorless solid that darkens in air due to oxidation.

== Synthesis and reactions ==
It is prepared by reduction of 1,5-dinitronaphthalene, which in turn is obtained with the 1,8-isomers by nitration of 1-nitronaphthalene. It can also be prepared by treatment of 1,5-dihydroxynaphthalene with ammonium sulfite. It is a precursor to naphthalene-1,5-diisocyanate, a precursor to specialty polyurethanes.

1,5-Diaminonaphthalene is a precursor imine-linked covalent organic frameworks.

== Applications ==
Analytical matrix for MALDI/LDI. 1,5-Diaminonaphthalene (often as the hydrochloride salt) is used as a low-background matrix for MALDI mass spectrometry, including mass spectrometry imaging (MSI) of small molecules in tissue sections. It has also been reported as a highly performing electron-transfer matrix for LDI analyses of low-mass species.

Precursor to naphthalene-1,5-diisocyanate (NDI). 1,5-Diaminonaphthalene is an industrial intermediate to diisocyanates, notably naphthalene-1,5-diisocyanate (NDI), which is used to make high-performance polyurethane elastomers (marketed as Vulkollan, based on Desmodur 15).

== See also ==
- 1,8-Diaminonaphthalene
