= Chloronaphthalene =

Chloronaphthalene may refer to:

- 1-Chloronaphthalene
- 2-Chloronaphthalene
