= Orphaned wells in the United States =

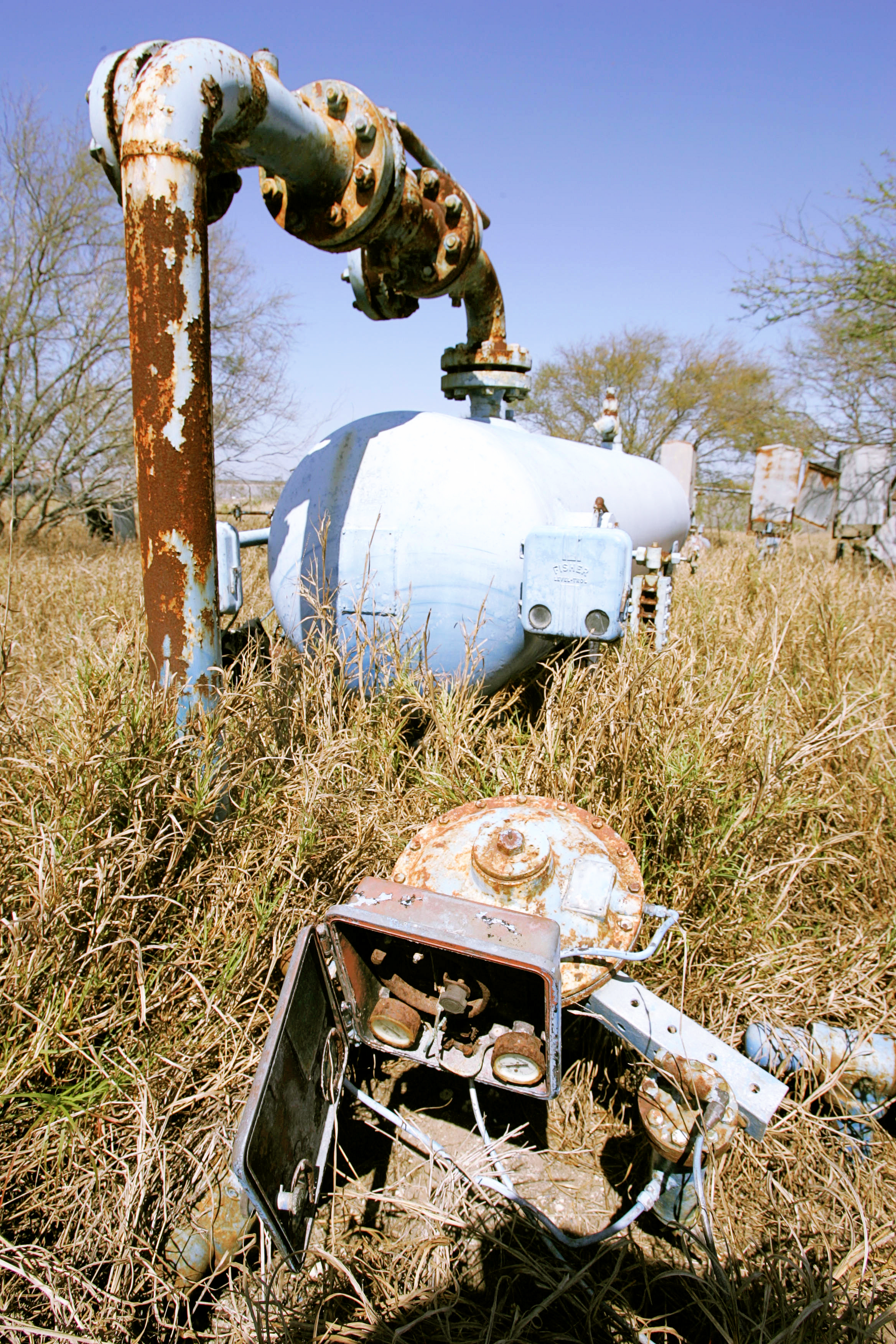
Abandoned gas well located in Lower Rio Grande Valley National Wildlife Refuge

Though different jurisdictions have varying criteria for what exactly qualifies as an orphaned or abandoned oil well, generally speaking, an oil well is considered abandoned when it has been permanently taken out of production. Similarly, orphaned wells may have different legal definitions across different jurisdictions, but can be thought of as wells whose legal owner it is not possible to determine.

Once a well is abandoned, it can be a source of toxic emissions and pollution contaminating groundwater and releasing methane, making orphan wells a significant contributor to national greenhouse gas emissions. For this reason, several state and federal programs have been initiated to plug wells; however, many of these programs are under capacity. In states like Texas and New Mexico, these programs do not have enough funding or staff to fully evaluate and implement mitigation programs.

According to the Government Accountability Office, the 2.1 million unplugged abandoned wells in the United States could cost as much as $300 billion. A joint Grist and The Texas Observer investigation in 2021 highlighted how government estimates of abandoned wells in Texas and New Mexico were likely underestimated and that market forces might have reduced prices so much creating peak oil conditions that would lead to more abandonment. Advocates of programs like the Green New Deal and broader climate change mitigation policy in the United States have advocated for funding plugging programs that would address stranded assets and provide a Just Transition for skilled oil and gas workers.

== State definitions ==
State legislatures in the United States have specific definitions based on local needs and priorities. For example, the section on abandoned wells in Texas' Natural Resource Code defines an "inactive well" as "an unplugged well that has had no reported production, disposal, injection, or other permitted activity for a period of greater than 12 months."

Pennsylvania's definition of abandoned well includes not producing for 12 months, "considered dry and not equipped for production within 60 days after drilling, re-drilling or deepening, and from which the equipment needed to extract resources or produce energy has been removed."

Ohio legislation defines "idle and orphaned wells" based on whether or not a well bond has been forfeited or the money to plug it is unavailable. It defines a "temporary inactive well status" as not having produced for two (non-horizontal wells) or eight (horizontal wells) statutorily defined reporting periods or one that has produced "less than 100,000 cubic feet of natural gas or 15 barrels of crude oil."

== Environmental impacts ==
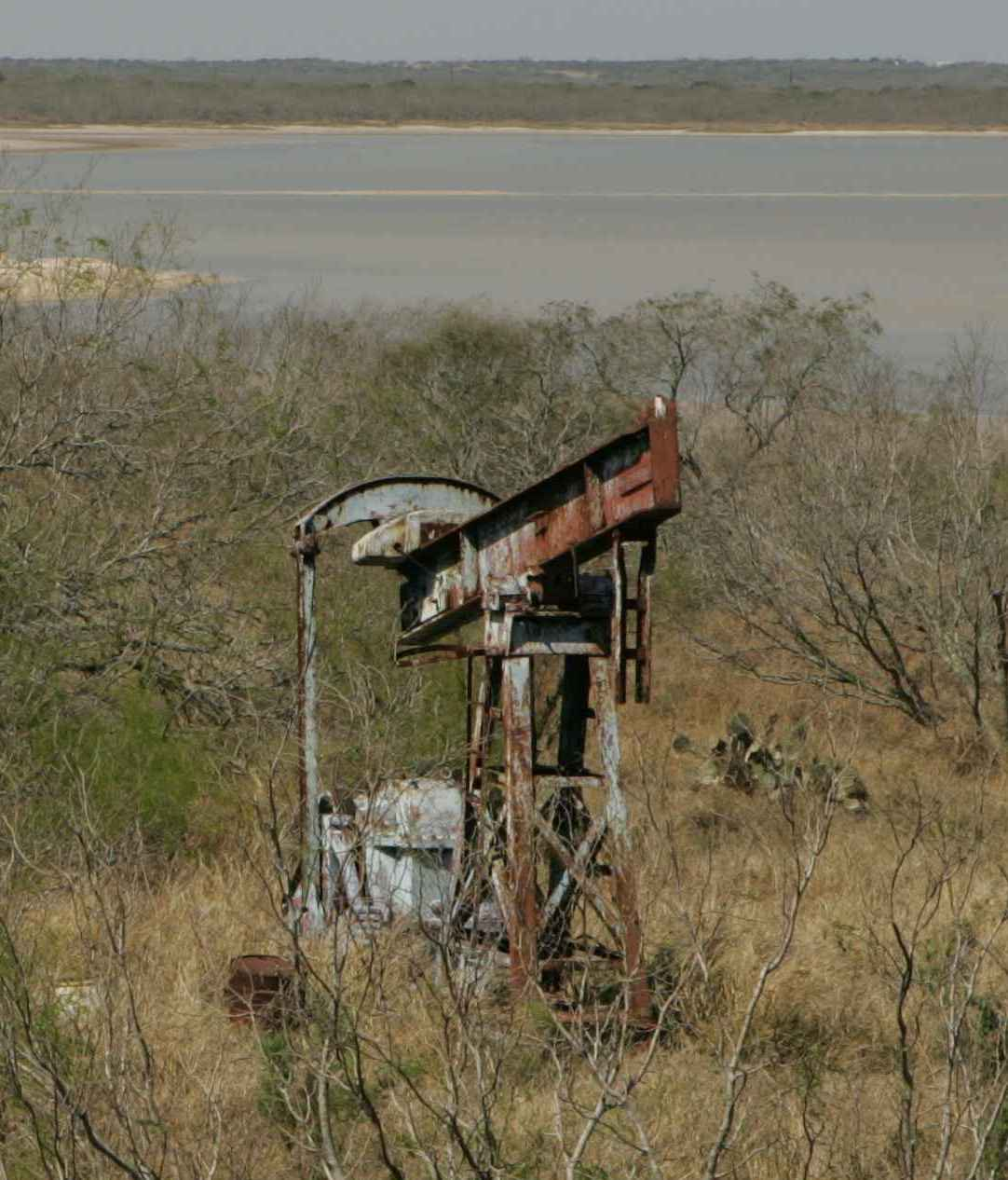
Abandoned wells can eventually leak leading to pollutants entering the atmosphere or the water supply.

Orphaned and abandoned wells can cause environmental damage by leaking pollutants into the atmosphere or water supplies. Important determinants of how much orphaned and abandoned wells impact the environment include the techniques used and precautions taken when first drilling the well, whether it is a gas well, oil well, or combined oil and gas well, and if and how the well was sealed.

If wells are not properly sealed when orphaned or abandoned, there can allow oil and gas to contaminate groundwater. It is also possible for orphaned and abandoned wells to be significant emitters of methane and hydrogen sulfide into the atmosphere. Furthermore, brine present in wells dug into shale formations can contain some radioactive and toxic substances that contaminate groundwater if the well leaks. Plugging wells can reduce the risk of explosions and protect groundwater, but does not always prevent methane emissions. The costs to mitigate the impact of orphaned and abandoned wells varies, but may include removing all equipment from the site, restoring the land and topsoil, and planting local species, in addition to plugging the well itself. For example, plugging a well and restoring the surrounding land costs an average of $100,000 for wells in the Marcellus Shale.

One problem with studying the impacts of orphaned and abandoned wells is that data about them can be scarce and incomplete. In the United States, it is possible for wells to have been orphaned or abandoned for over a century, and information about them, if it exists at all, can be difficult to find.

== State programs for mitigation ==
North Dakota dedicated $66 million of its CARES Act pandemic relief funds for plugging and reclaiming abandoned and orphaned wells.

The REGROW Act, which is part of the Infrastructure Investment and Jobs Act, includes $4.7 billion in funds for plugging and maintaining orphaned wells. The Interior Department has documented the existence of 130,000 orphaned wells nationwide. An EPA study estimated that there are as many as two to three million wells across the nation.

New York State is expecting to receive $70 million from the Act in 2022 which will be used to plug orphaned wells. The state has 6,809 orphaned wells, and the NYSDEC estimates it will cost $248 million to plug them all. The NYSDEC uses a fleet of drones carrying magnetometers to find orphaned wells.

In 2023, state governments in Pennsylvania, Ohio, and California reported a shortage of trained staff necessary to implement federally funded well capping programs. Qualified oil field workers were also in short supply in Pennsylvania and Ohio. Federally funded well plugging contracts are required to meet Davis-Bacon Act standards for prevailing wages, in order to ensure that the training of new oil field workers will contribute to local economic development in rural areas.

== Responses ==
One way to encourage well owners not to abandon or orphan wells and to make sure wells are safely abandoned is to use well bonds. These are bonds paid by well operators to a surety company and are held by an obligee (state or federal entity) until the well has been satisfactorily plugged and the land surface restored. A significant challenge of making well bonds an effective policy tool is to set their price to a point that does not make market entry prohibitively expensive, but also does not incentivize well operators to forfeit the bond instead of undertaking the abandonment requirements specified in local law.

Another way to encourage well owners not to abandon or orphan wells is to retrofit oil and gas wells to produce geothermal energy. One benefit of this approach is that it is less expensive to retrofit an abandoned well to produce geothermal energy than it is to drill a new oil or gas well. It also saves the cost of exploring sites for geothermal fields. Avoiding new exploration and drilling avoids the environmental impacts of these activities. However, geothermal fluids can contain environmentally hazardous chemicals such as hydrogen sulfide, ammonia, methane, arsenic, mercury, and lead.

A third option is to mandate that well operators establish reclamation trusts which would be used to pay reclamation costs if the operator does not perform the necessary plugging and land restoration within a given time period after abandoning the well. This policy option has been used to mitigate the environmental impact of mines in the United States as part of a combined command-and-control and market incentive policy response to environmental protection. One risk attached to this policy option is that if wells become economically unproductive before the period planned for in the trust agreement, the abandoned well could become a liability held by the relevant government authority.

A Montana-based non-profit, the Well Done Foundation, was founded in 2019 by a retired oil and gas industry executive to start plugging wells, one well at a time.

== See also ==
- Orphan wells in Alberta, Canada

== Television report ==
- dw.com (12 Nov 2024): Cleaning up a toxic legacy, one oil well at a time (4 min. How the Well Done Foundation seals oil wells with a cement filling since its foundation in 2019)
