= Peri-naphthalenes =

In organic chemistry, peri-naphthalenes are particular derivatives of naphthalene with the formula C_{10}H_{6}-1,8-X_{2}.

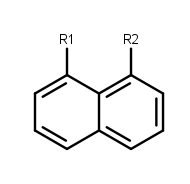
General structure of a perinaphthalene, where R1 and R2 represent the substituents.

Owing to the rigidity of the naphthalene skeleton, these substituents on the 1- and 8-positions are constrained to be relatively close 2.5 Å, which is within the van der Waals radius for many atoms. In contrast, ortho-substituents pendant from a benzene ring are separated by about 3.3 Å.

== Examples ==
Because of this unusual structural feature, many unusual compounds are derived from peri-naphthalenes. One example is 1,8-bis(dimethylamino)naphthalene, known as proton sponge because of its high affinity for protons. Its ammonium derivative has a pK_{a} of 12.7. The compound 1,8-bis(dimethylboryl)naphthalene is known as hydride sponge because of its high affinity for hydride. It solubilizes potassium hydride. Other distinctive compounds include the diphosphine 1,8-bis(diphenylphosphino)naphthalene (dppn) and the disulfide, both of which are ligand precursors.

== Synthesis ==
Several peri-naphthalenes are prepared via nitrations. Nitration of naphthalene gives 1,8-dinitronaphthalene, which undergoes hydrogenation to the diamine. The diamine can also be produced by reaction of the 1,8-diol with ammonia at high temperatures. The peri-naphthalene 1-amino-naphthalene-8-sulfonic acid is a precursor to other peri-naphthalenes. It is prepared by nitration of naphthalene-1-sulfonic acid followed by reduction. Diazotization followed by loss of N_{2} gives the naphthosulfone. This species reacts with NaOH to give sequentially 1-hydroxynaphthalene-8-sulfonic acid and then the 1,8-diol.

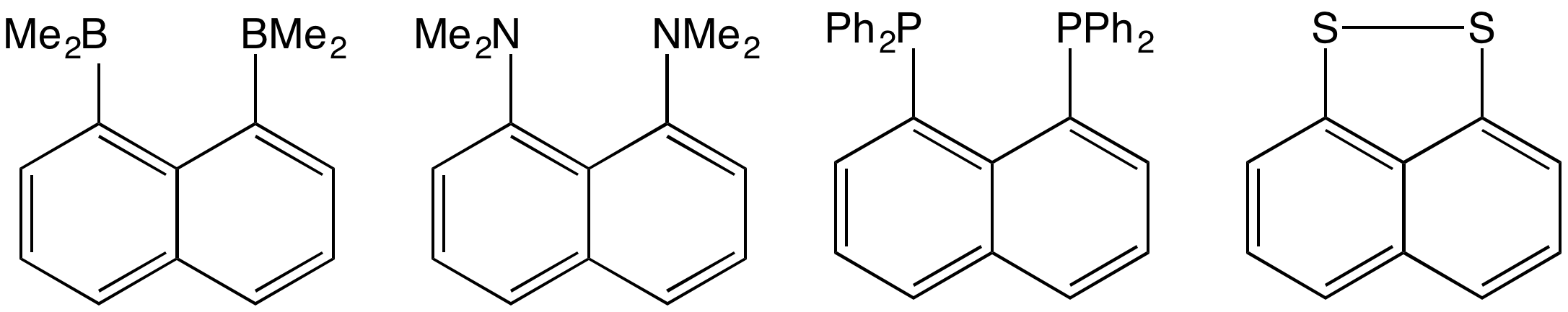
Four peri-naphthalene derivatives.

Certain perinaphthalene derivatives can be prepared from 1,8-dilithionaphthalene, which in turn is generated by dilithiation of 1-bromonaphthalene:

C_{10}H_{7}Br + BuLi → C_{10}H_{7}Li + BuBr
C_{10}H_{7}Li + BuLi → C_{10}H_{6}Li_{2} + BuH

The deprotonation requires TMEDA.

== See also ==
- 1,8-Dimethylnaphthalene, a perinaphthalene.
