= 1,8-Diaminonaphthalene =

Names
- Preferred IUPAC name Naphthalene-1,8-diamine
- Other names Deltamin, 1,8-Naphthalenediamine

Identifiers
CAS Number	479-27-6
3D model (JSmol)	Interactive image; Interactive image
ChEMBL	ChEMBL595537
ChemSpider	61381
ECHA InfoCard	100.006.846
PubChem CID	68067
UNII	IKA7029YH9
CompTox Dashboard (EPA)	DTXSID6044432
- InChI: InChI=1S/C10H10N2/c11-8-5-1-3-7-4-2-6-9(12)10(7)8/h1-6H,11-12H2 Key: YFOOEYJGMMJJLS-UHFFFAOYSA-N; InChI=1/C10H10N2/c11-8-5-1-3-7-4-2-6-9(12)10(7)8/h1-6H,11-12H2 Key: YFOOEYJGMMJJLS-UHFFFAOYAU
- SMILES: C1=CC2=C(C(=C1)N)C(=CC=C2)N; c1(cccc2cccc(N)c12)N

Properties
Chemical formula	C_{10}H_{10}N_{2}
Molar mass	158.1998

Related compounds
Related Aromatic amines	1-Naphthylamine; 1,8-bis(dimethylamino)naphthalene
- Except where otherwise noted, data are given for materials in their standard state (at 25 °C [77 °F], 100 kPa). verify (what is ?) Infobox references

1,8-Diaminonaphthalene is an organic compound with the formula C_{10}H_{6}(NH_{2})_{2}. It is one of several isomeric naphthalenediamines. It is a colorless solid that darkens in air due to oxidation. It is a precursor to commercial pigments.

== Synthesis and reactions ==
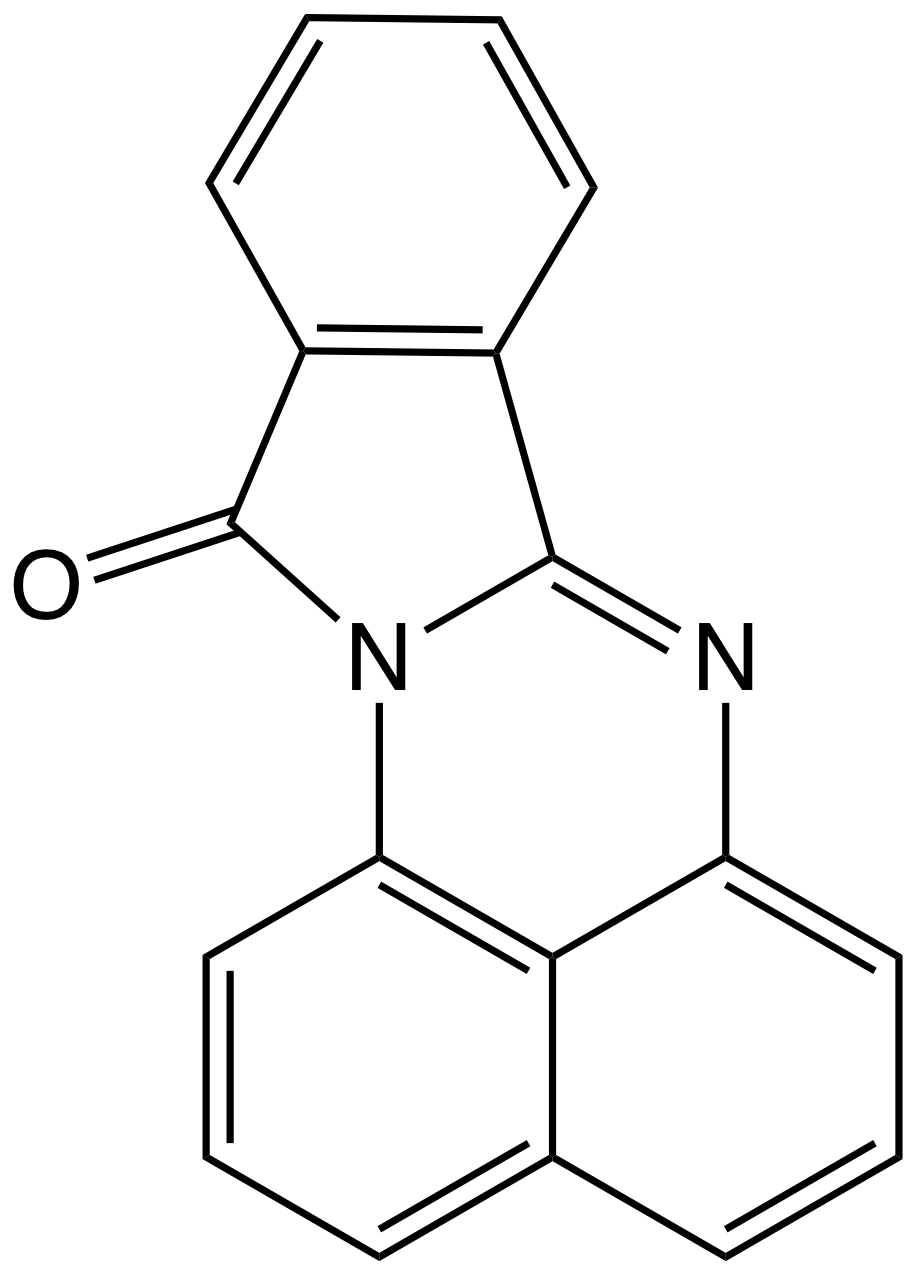
Chemical structure of 12-phthaloperinone, a derivative of 1,8-diaminonaphthalene

It is prepared by reduction of 1,8-dinitronaphthalene, which in turn is obtained (along with other dinitronaphthalenes) by nitration of 1-nitronaphthalene.

Upon treatment with phthalic anhydride derivatives, the diamine converts to phthaloperinones. The derivative from phthalic anhydride itself, Solvent Orange 60, is a useful orange pigment. It is a precursor to 1,8-bis(dimethylamino)naphthalene. This compound used to produce perimidines by various aldehydes.

== See also ==
- C_{10}H_{10}N_{2}
