= Orphan wells =

Disused oil or gas wells

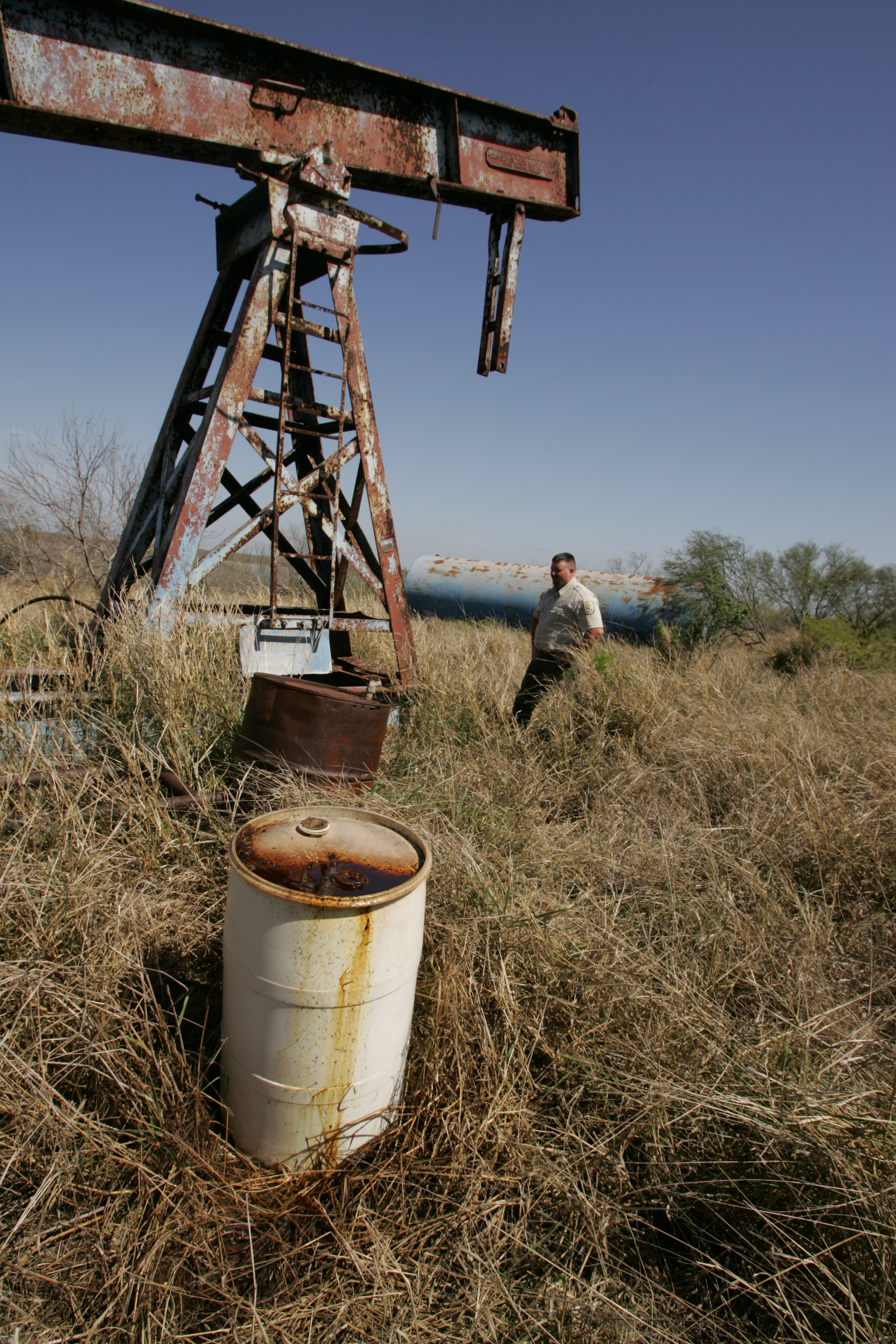
Abandoned oil well in the Lower Rio Grande Valley National Wildlife Refuge

Orphan, orphaned, or abandoned wells are oil or gas wells that have been abandoned by fossil fuel extraction industries. These wells may have been deactivated due to becoming uneconomic, failure to transfer ownerships (especially at bankruptcy of companies), or neglect, and thus no longer have legal owners responsible for their care. Decommissioning wells effectively can be expensive, costing several thousands of dollars for a shallow land well to millions of dollars for an offshore one. Thus the burden may fall on government agencies or surface landowners when a business entity can no longer be held responsible.

Orphan wells are a potent contributor of greenhouse gas emissions, such as methane emissions, contributing to climate change. Much of this leakage can be attributed to failure to have them plugged properly or leaking plugs. A 2020 estimate of abandoned wells in the United States was that methane emissions released from abandoned wells produced greenhouse gas impacts equivalent to three weeks of US oil consumption each year. The scale of leaking abandoned wells is well understood in the US and Canada because of public data and regulation; however, a Reuters investigation in 2020 could not find good estimates for Russia, Saudi Arabia and China—the next biggest oil and gas producers. However, they estimate there are 29 million abandoned wells internationally.

Abandoned wells have the potential to contaminate land, air and water, potentially harming ecosystems, wildlife, livestock, and humans. For example, many wells in the United States are situated on farmland, and if not maintained could contaminate soil and groundwater with toxic contaminants.

== Economic limits ==
A well is said to reach an "economic limit" when revenue from production does not cover the operating expenses, including taxes. If the economic limit is increased, the useful life of the well is shortened and proven oil reserves are lost. Conversely, when the financial limit is lowered, the life of the well is lengthened. When the economic limit is reached, the well becomes a liability if not abandoned.

At the economic limit, a significant amount of unrecoverable oil is often left in the reservoir. It might be tempting to defer physical abandonment for an extended period, hoping that the oil price will increase or that new supplemental recovery techniques will be perfected. In these cases, wells are merely shut in, or temporary plugs may be placed downhole. There are thousands of "temporarily abandoned" wells throughout North America, waiting to see what the market will do before permanent abandonment. However, lease provisions and governmental regulations often require quick abandonment; liability and tax concerns also may favor abandonment.

Theoretically, an abandoned well can be re-entered to restore production (or converted to injection service for supplemental recovery or downhole hydrocarbon storage), but reentry is often difficult mechanically and expensive. Traditionally elastomer and cement plugs have been used with varying degrees of success and reliability. Over time, they may deteriorate, particularly in corrosive environments, due to the materials from which they are manufactured. New tools have been developed that make re-entry easier; these tools offer higher expansion ratios than conventional bridge plugs and higher differential pressure ratings than inflatable packers, all while providing a V0-rated, gas-tight seal that cement cannot provide.

== Reclaim and reuse ==
Some abandoned wells are subsequently plugged and the site is remediated; however, the cost of such efforts can be in the millions of dollars. In this process, tubing is removed from the well, and sections of wellbore are filled with cement to isolate the flow path between gas and water zones from each other, as well as from the surface. The wellhead is cut off, a cap is welded in place and then the stub is buried as the land contours are restored.

=== Plugging ===
The primary method of plugging wells is through elastomer and cement plugs. Government-led campaigns to plug wells are expensive but often facilitated by oil and gas taxes, bonds, or other fees applied to production. Environmental non-profit organizations, such as the Well Done Foundation, also carry out well-plugging projects and develop programs alongside government entities.

==== Plug bonds ====
Oil and gas companies on public land in the United States must post financial assurance to cover the cost of plugging wells if they go bankrupt or cannot plug the well themselves. The current financial assurance requirement, which has been in place for 60 years, is $10,000 per well. This is significantly less than the cost of plugging a well, ranging as high as $400,000. Thus many federal oil and gas leases have a bond that cannot cover the cost of cleanup.

New rules related to the Infrastructure Investment and Jobs Act will increase the financial assurance requirement to a minimum of $150,000 per well. This will help ensure that oil and gas companies have the financial resources to plug wells if they can no longer do so themselves.

=== CO2 injection ===
Unused wells, especially from natural gas might be used for carbon capture or storage. However, if not sealed properly, or the storage site is not sufficiently sealed, there is a possibility of leakage.

=== Geothermal generation ===
A 2014 study in China evaluated the use of abandoned wells for geothermal power generation. A similar study followed in 2019 for natural gas wells.

== Environmental impacts ==
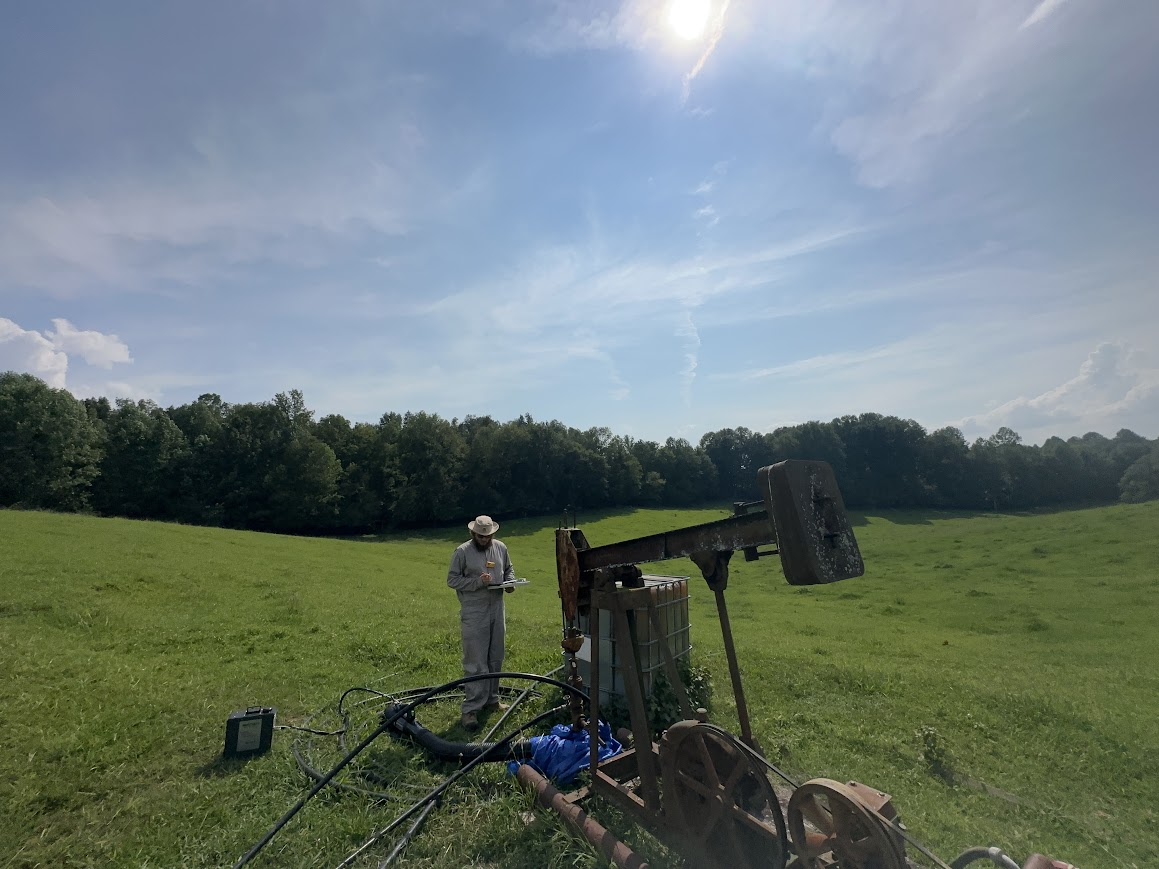
Orphan Well being measured for Methane Emissions in South Central Kentucky

=== Methane emissions ===
Abandoned wells are one of the largest emitters of unmitigated methane globally, and the existing measurements of these emissions is often inaccurate, because of uncounting of wells or underestimation of leakage. Short term, Methane is one of the largest contributors to climate change, with 84 times greater impact than CO2 in 20 year periods.

=== Hydraulic fracturing ===
Hydraulic fracturing, also known as fracture treating or fracking, is the process of fracturing bedrock with pressurized liquids. This creates cracks in rock formations that allow natural gas, petroleum, and brine to flow more effortlessly. When hydraulic fracturing is done in the vicinity of an orphaned well it can cause breaches of poorly sealed or unsealed abandoned wells that possibly can contaminate local ecosystems. These orphaned wells can allow gas and oil to contaminate groundwater due to improper sealing. This may lead to ecological and environmental damages.

=== Offshore hazards and contamination ===
Wells driven in coastal westlands or offshore can become navigation hazards, that also quickly become environmental hazards. For example, in a number of areas off the coast of Louisiana, sea level rise and subsidencehas caused some of the wells that are in coastal wetlands to become part of waterways that would otherwise be navigable. A 2025 report by NOLA.com, reported several have already caused accidents with small craft.

Offshore wells in Texas have been shown to be leaking chemicals into important waterways for fishing and tourism.

=== Aquifer contamination ===
Orphan wells can be channels for contamination of aquifers with hydrocarbons and drilling brine, with hundreds of such incidents identified in the United States. A USGS study that looked at the nearly 117,672 documented wells in the United States, found that 54 percent of the wells are within aquifers that supply 94 percent of groundwater use in the US.

== By context ==
=== Alberta, Canada ===
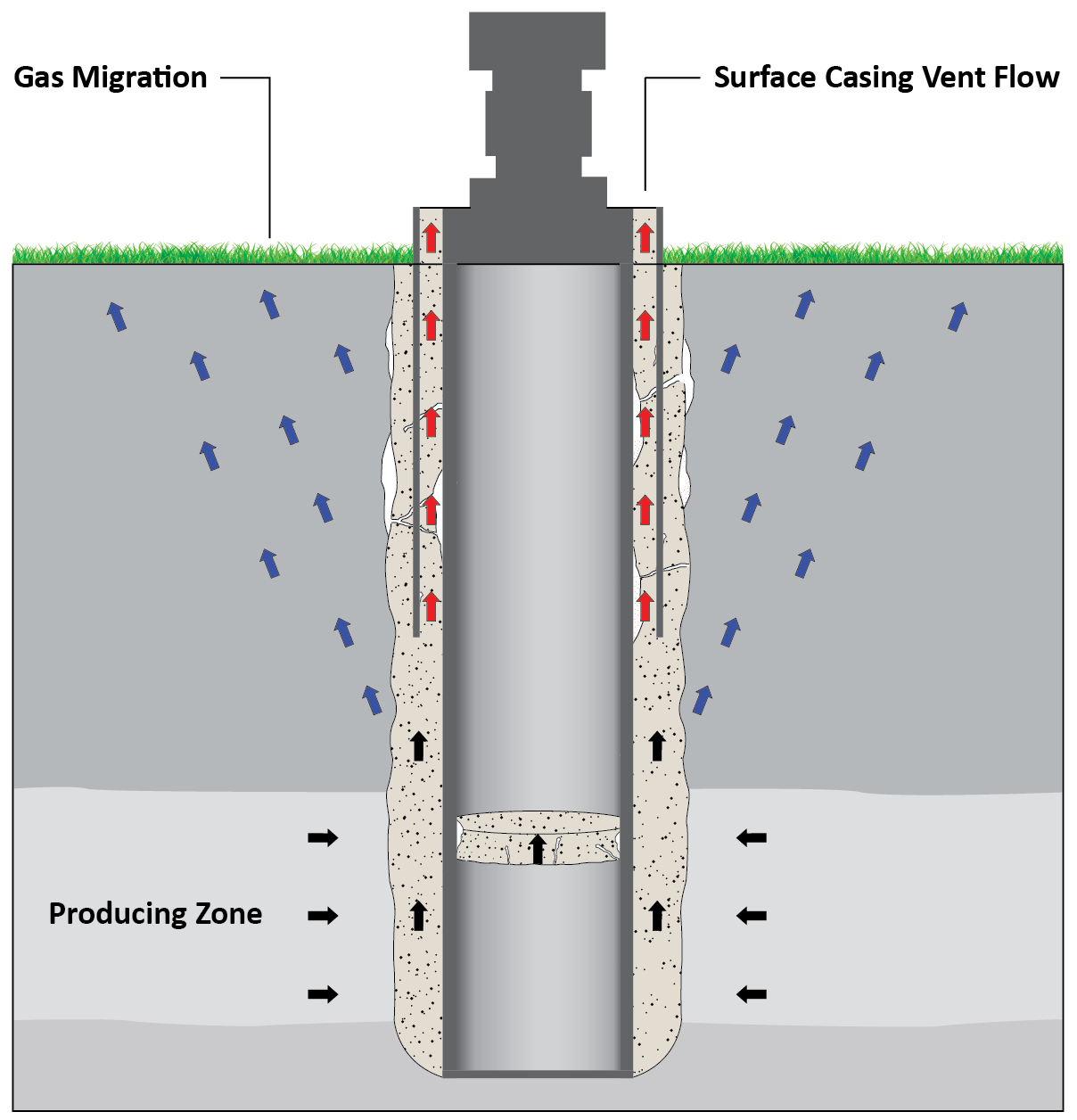
Fugitive gas emissions are leaking from this "abandoned" (Note: The oil and gas industry uses the term "abandoned" to refer to plugged wells, which has led to "countless confusing headlines.") plugged well, which may be licensed to an operator and suspended, or simply orphaned.

Orphan wells in Alberta, Canada are inactive oil or gas well sites that have no solvent owner who can be held legally or financially accountable for the decommissioning and reclamation obligations to ensure public safety and to address environmental liabilities.

The 100% industry-funded Alberta Energy Regulator (AER)—the sole regulator of the province's energy sector—manages licensing and enforcement related to the full lifecycle of oil and gas wells based on Alberta Environment Ministry requirements, including orphaned and abandoned wells. Oil and gas licensees are liable for the responsible and safe closure and clean-up of their oil and gas well sites under the Polluter Pays Principle (PPP) as a legal asset retirement obligation (ARO). An operator's liability for surface reclamation issues continues for 25 years following the issuance of a site reclamation certificate. There is also a lifelong liability in case of contamination.

Once the current environmental legislation was in place, and the industry-led and industry-funded Orphan Wells Association (OWA), was established in 2002, some orphan wells became the OWA's responsibility. OWA's Inventory does not include legacy wells which are more complex, time-intensive and costly to remediate. Following the 2014 downturn in the global price of oil, there was a "tsunami" of orphaned wells, facilities, and pipelines resulting from bankruptcies.

As of March 2023, oil and gas companies owe rural municipalities $268 million in unpaid taxes; they owe landowners "tens of millions in unpaid lease payments". Original owners of what are now orphan wells "failed to fulfill their responsibility for costly end-of-life decommissioning and restoration work"; some sold these wells "strategically to insolvent operators". Landowners suffer both "environmental and economic consequences" of having these wells on their property. OWA funding is underfunded by at least several hundred million. The total estimate for cleaning up all existing sites is as much as $260 billion. Remediation is paid for through federal and provincial bailouts, a PPP violation.

=== United States ===
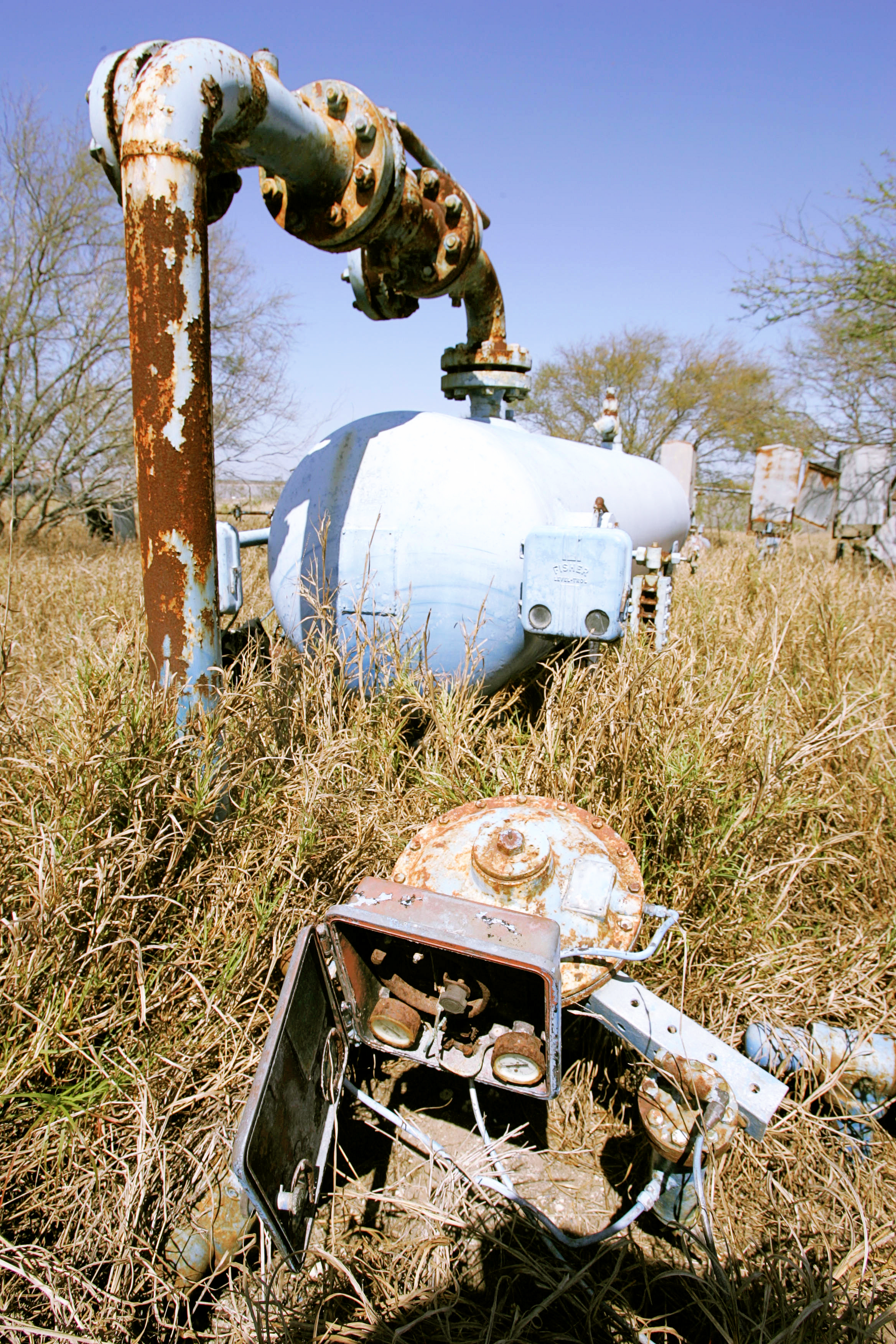
Abandoned gas well located in Lower Rio Grande Valley National Wildlife Refuge

Though different jurisdictions have varying criteria for what exactly qualifies as an orphaned or abandoned oil well, generally speaking, an oil well is considered abandoned when it has been permanently taken out of production. Similarly, orphaned wells may have different legal definitions across different jurisdictions, but can be thought of as wells whose legal owner it is not possible to determine.

Once a well is abandoned, it can be a source of toxic emissions and pollution contaminating groundwater and releasing methane, making orphan wells a significant contributor to national greenhouse gas emissions. For this reason, several state and federal programs have been initiated to plug wells; however, many of these programs are under capacity. In states like Texas and New Mexico, these programs do not have enough funding or staff to fully evaluate and implement mitigation programs.

According to the Government Accountability Office, the 2.1 million unplugged abandoned wells in the United States could cost as much as $300 billion. A joint Grist and The Texas Observer investigation in 2021 highlighted how government estimates of abandoned wells in Texas and New Mexico were likely underestimated and that market forces might have reduced prices so much creating peak oil conditions that would lead to more abandonment. Advocates of programs like the Green New Deal and broader climate change mitigation policy in the United States have advocated for funding plugging programs that would address stranded assets and provide a Just Transition for skilled oil and gas workers.
