= 1,8-Bis(dimethylamino)naphthalene =

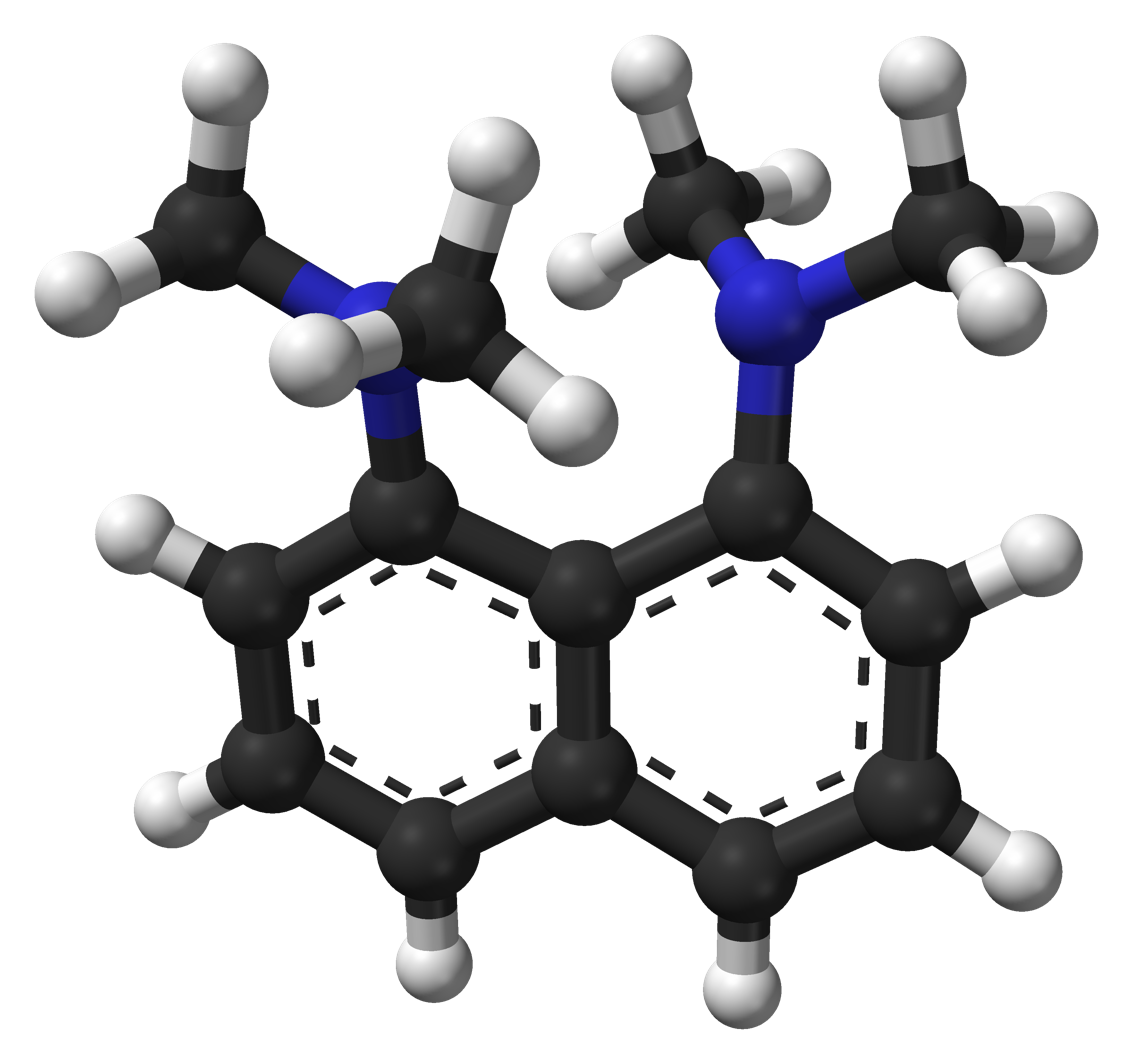

Names
- Preferred IUPAC name N^{1},N^{1},N^{8},N^{8}-Tetramethylnaphthalene-1,8-diamine
- Other names N,N,N′,N′-Tetramethylnaphthalene-1,8-diamine; Proton Sponge

Identifiers
CAS Number	20734-58-1
3D model (JSmol)	Interactive image; Interactive image
ChemSpider	80012
ECHA InfoCard	100.039.986
PubChem CID	88675
UNII	6S79D2P9H8
CompTox Dashboard (EPA)	DTXSID10174807
- InChI: InChI=1S/C14H18N2/c1-15(2)12-9-5-7-11-8-6-10-13(14(11)12)16(3)4/h5-10H,1-4H3 Key: GJFNRSDCSTVPCJ-UHFFFAOYSA-N; InChI=1/C14H18N2/c1-15(2)12-9-5-7-11-8-6-10-13(14(11)12)16(3)4/h5-10H,1-4H3 Key: GJFNRSDCSTVPCJ-UHFFFAOYAM
- SMILES: CN(C)C1=CC=CC2=C1C(=CC=C2)N(C)C; c1(cccc2cccc(N(C)C)c12)N(C)C

Properties
Chemical formula	C_{14}H_{18}N_{2}
Molar mass	214.312 g·mol^{−1}
Appearance	White crystalline powder
Melting point	47.8 °C (118.0 °F; 320.9 K)
Acidity (pK_{a})	12.1 (in water) 18.62 (in acetonitrile) (acidity of the conjugate acid C_{14}H_{18}N_{2}H^{+})
- Except where otherwise noted, data are given for materials in their standard state (at 25 °C [77 °F], 100 kPa). verify (what is ?) Infobox references

1,8-Bis(dimethylamino)naphthalene is an organic compound with the formula C_{10}H_{6}(NMe_{2})_{2} (Me = methyl). It is classified as a peri-naphthalene, i.e. a 1,8-disubstituted derivative of naphthalene. Owing to its unusual structure, it exhibits exceptional basicity. It is often referred by the trade name Proton Sponge, a trademark of Sigma-Aldrich.

== Structure and properties ==
This compound is a diamine in which the two dimethylamino groups are attached on the same side (peri position) of a naphthalene ring. This molecule has several very interesting properties; one is its very high basicity; another is its spectroscopic properties.

With a pK_{a} of 12.34 for its conjugate acid in aqueous solution, 1,8-bis(dimethylamino)naphthalene is one of the strongest neutral organic bases. However, it only absorbs protons slowly—hence the trade name. The high basicity is attributed to the relief of strain upon protonation and/or the strong interaction between the nitrogen lone pairs. Additionally, although many aromatic amines such as aniline show reduced basicity (due to nitrogen being sp^{2} hybridized; its lone pair occupying a 2p orbital and interacting and being withdrawn by the aromatic ring), this is not possible in this molecule, as the nitrogens' methyl groups prevent its substituents from adopting a planar geometry, as this would require forcing methyl groups from each nitrogen atom into one another—thus the basicity is not reduced by this factor which is found in other molecules. It is sterically hindered, making it a weak nucleophile. Because of this combination of properties, it has been used in organic synthesis as a highly selective non-nucleophilic base.

Proton sponge also exhibits a very high affinity for boron and is capable of displacing hydride from borane to form a boronium–borohydride ion pair.

== Preparation ==
This compound is commercially available. It may be prepared by the methylation of 1,8-diaminonaphthalene with iodomethane or dimethyl sulfate.

== Related compounds ==
=== Other proton sponges ===
Second generation proton sponges are known with even higher basicity. 1,8-bis(hexamethyltriaminophosphazenyl)naphthalene or HMPN is prepared from 1,8-diaminonaphthalene by reaction with tris(dimethylamino)bromophosphonium bromide in the presence of triethylamine. HMPN has a pK_{BH+} of 29.9 in acetonitrile which is more than 11 orders of magnitude higher than Proton Sponge.

The aromatization of an additional ring in 4,12-Dihydrogen-4,8,12-triazatriangulene is utilized by Al-Yassiri and Puchta to get a representative for a new class of Δ-shaped proton sponges. This compound has a calculated proton affinity of 254 kcal/mol (B3LYP/6-311+G**) and is therefore between 1,8-Bis(dimethylamino)naphthalene and HMPN.

=== Hydride sponge ===
The chemical inverse of a proton sponge would be a hydride sponge. This property is exhibited by C_{10}H_{6}(BMe_{2})_{2}, which reacts with potassium hydride to afford K[C_{10}H_{6}(BMe_{2})_{2}H].
