= Well Done Foundation =

American environmental non-profit organization

- Abbreviation: WDF
- Formation: 2019; 3 years ago
- Founder: Curtis Shuck
- Type: Non-profit
- Purpose: Environmental action
- Headquarters: Shelby, MT
- Location: United States
- Methods: Plugging wells, education
- Chairperson: Curtis Shuck
- Staff: 10+
- Website: welldonefoundation.org

The Well Done Foundation (WDF) is a United States-based non-profit environmental organization that plugs abandoned oil and gas wells, preventing methane emissions from being released into the atmosphere. Established in 2019 with its headquarters in Shelby, Montana, WDF is a vendor for the carbon marketplace and sells offsets verified through the American Carbon Registry (ACR).

== History ==
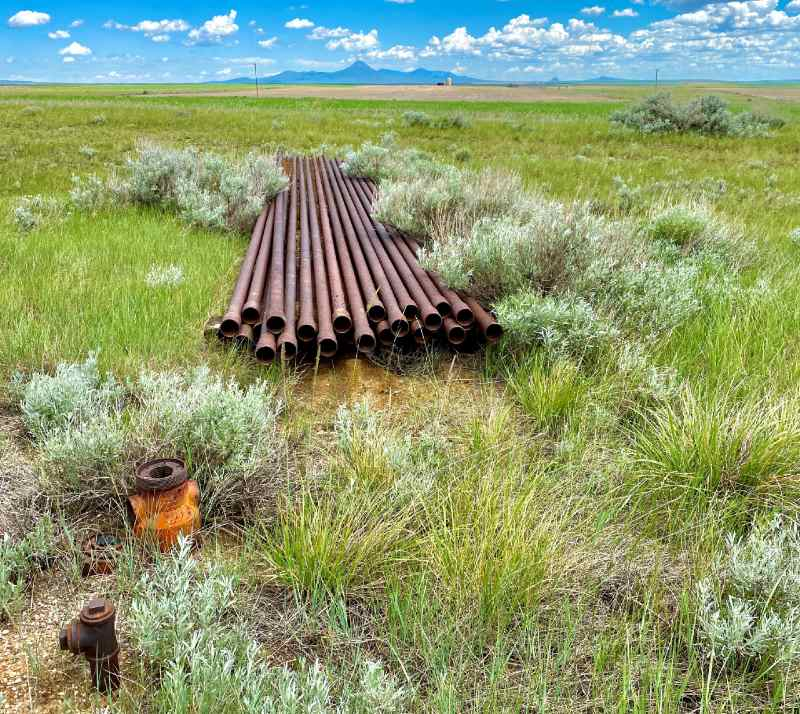
The Bluhm 14 well was drilled in 1934 and produced from the Madison Group. The last recorded production was in 2003, when the well produced 144 barrels of oil over a 15-day period. It was plugged by the Well Done Foundation on April 7, 2021.

In 2019, Curtis Shuck, a former oil and gas executive of 30 years, was in Shelby, MT meeting with farmers when he discovered abandoned oil and gas wells scattered around the town's farm fields. In November 2019, Shuck initially created the Well Done Montana (WDM), LLC; a for-profit organization designed to plug wells in Montana. The organization started its pilot project in its home state and plugged its first well, known as Anderson #3, in Toole County, Montana, in April 2020. Anderson #3 stopped producing oil in the 1980s and was emitting more than 6,600 MTCO_{2}e before it was plugged.

WDM was formally reorganized into the Well Done Foundation as a non-profit 501(c)(3) organization in 2020. In June 2020, two more wells, Allen #31-8 and Blum #12, were plugged by WDF in Montana.

WDF continued to expand its operations across the United States throughout 2021, amidst the COVID-19 pandemic, including Pennsylvania, New York, Ohio, West Virginia, Kansas, Louisiana, and Texas.

In September 2023, ABB announced it would partner with the Well Done Foundation to monitor methane and greenhouse gas emissions from orphaned wells in the United States.

== Process ==
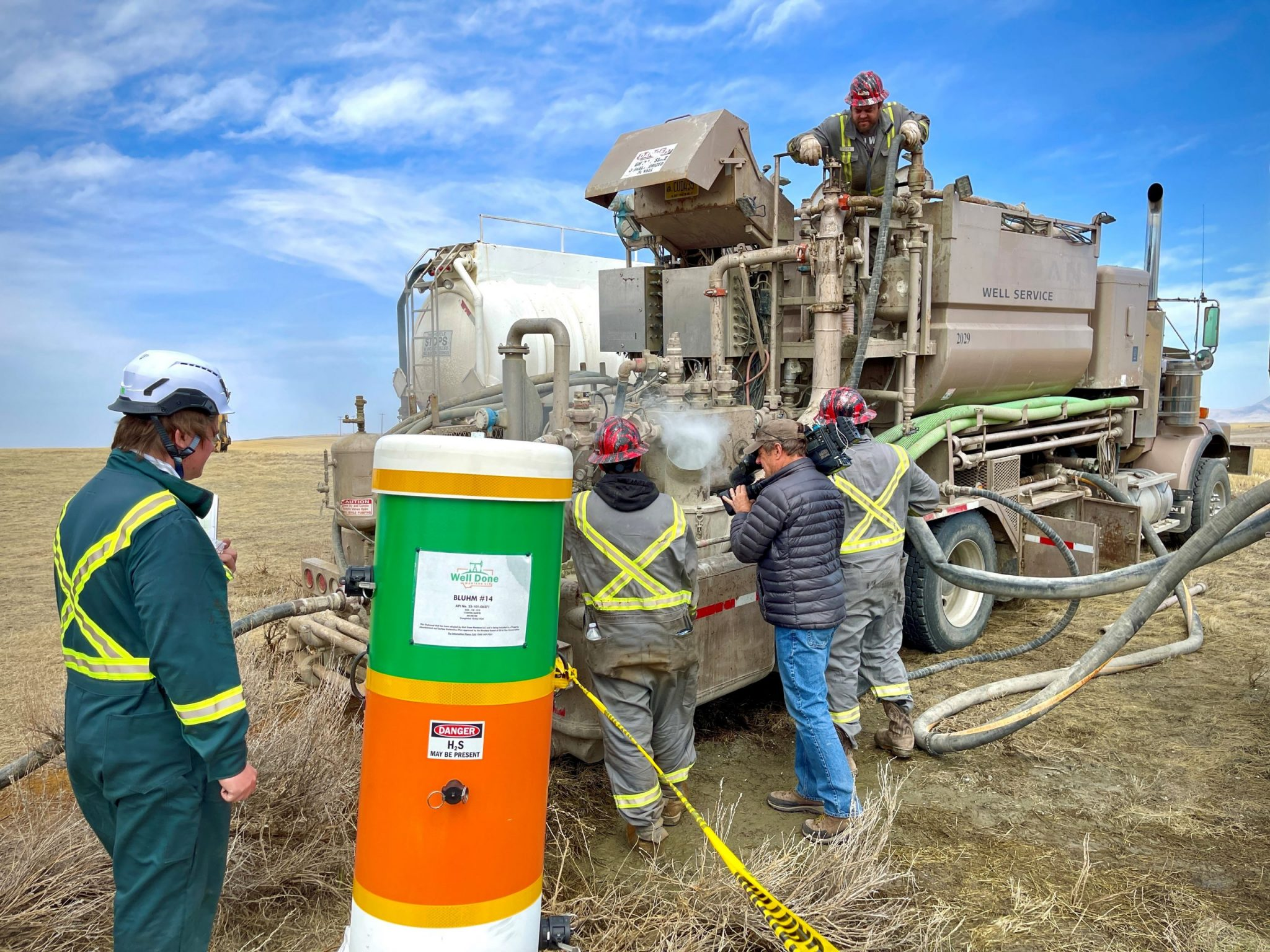
Following the plugging of an abandoned well, contractors use a methane monitoring platform provided by the WDF, known as "Dorothy", to collect methane measurements.

The WDF follows a five-step process to plug a well. It first identifies wells of interest in whichever state it is operating in, then researches well emissions of individual sites, alongside the history of the well, its depth, and materials needed to plug it, for a nine-month period. A bond is then posted and WDF adopts the well from the State. A budget is prepared for the project and a campaign is established to raise funds for the well's plugging and costs for surface restoration. Each campaign is funded entirely through donations and partnerships, with each well costing around $65,000 to plug.

Once the funding goal is reached, contractors are employed to carry out the plugging process and a gel is pumped through the well's piping, then filled with concrete. Following the sealing process, a methane monitoring platform, known by WDF as "Dorothy", is placed over the well and collects data on the methane emissions to see if the plugging operation successfully stopped methane leakage. WDF then works with surface land owners to restore the surface surrounding the well to its pre-drilling state.

== In the media ==
- Vice News: "This Retired Oil Exec Wants to Plug Up Millions of Abandoned Wells Across the US"
- Washington Post: "Capping methane-spewing oil wells, one hole at a time"
- Pittsburgh Post-Gazette: "Ask Me About... a new model for plugging old oil wells"
- KSBY California's Central Coast: "Nonprofit tackles methane emissions 'one well at a time'"
- Williston Herald: "Well Done Foundation to celebrate one-year anniversary, Earth Day by plugging its fifth well"
- U.S. News & World Report: "Montana Foundation Capping Abandoned Oil Wells"
- Helena Independent Record: "Capping off problems: Montana-based company takes on abandoned wells"
- Yes! magazine: "How Montana Is Cleaning Up Abandoned Oil Wells"
- Marcellus Drilling News: "Seneca Sponsors Plugging of Century-Old Orphan Well in McKean, PA"
- Bradford Era: "Appalachian Legacy Project to be 'boots on ground' for Well Done Foundation"
- ITV: "Climate change: Millions of disused oil wells in US are pumping out methane - what's being done?"
- Grist: "Abandonment Issues"
