= Diaminonaphthalene =

Diaminonaphthalene describes several isomers containing naphthalene substituted with two amine groups (NH_{2}), also called naphthalenediamines. All isomers are white solids that tend to air-oxidize. The 2,3-, 1,5-, and 1,8- derivatives have attracted most attention.

- 1,2-Diaminonaphthalene 938-25-0
- 1,3-Diaminonaphthalene 24824-28-0
- 1,4-Diaminonaphthalene 2243-61-0
- 1,5-Diaminonaphthalene 2243-62-1
- 1,7-Diaminonaphthalene 2243-64-3
- 1,8-Diaminonaphthalene 479-27-6
- 2,3-Diaminonaphthalene 771-97-1
- 2,6-Diaminonaphthalene 2243-67-6
- 2,7-Diaminonaphthalene 613-76-3
