= Triphenylphosphine dibromide =

- (C_{6}H_{5})_{3}PBr^{+} Br^{−}

Names
- Other names bromotriphenylphosphonium bromide, dibromotriphenylphosphorane

Identifiers
CAS Number	1034-39-5 (incorrect structure)
3D model (JSmol)	Interactive image
ChemSpider	8312538
ECHA InfoCard	100.012.596
PubChem CID	10137025
UNII	7Y0J6R63JD
CompTox Dashboard (EPA)	DTXSID3061423
- InChI: InChI=1S/C18H15BrP.BrH/c19-20(16-10-4-1-5-11-16,17-12-6-2-7-13-17)18-14-8-3-9-15-18;/h1-15H;1H/q+1;/p-1 Key: UWGULZXZFOYYJT-UHFFFAOYSA-M
- SMILES: C1=CC=C(C=C1)[P+](C2=CC=CC=C2)(C3=CC=CC=C3)Br.[Br-]

Properties
Chemical formula	C_{18}H_{15}Br_{2}P_{2}
Molar mass	453.074 g·mol^{−1}
Appearance	White solid
Density	1.194 g/cm^{3}
Melting point	235 °C (455 °F; 508 K)
Refractive index (n_{D})	1.6358
- Except where otherwise noted, data are given for materials in their standard state (at 25 °C [77 °F], 100 kPa). Infobox references

Triphenylphosphine dibromide is the organophosphorus compound with the formula (C_{6}H_{5})_{3}PBr_{2}. It is a white or colorless hygroscopic solid that is used as a brominating agent in organic synthesis. It is prepared by the addition of bromine to triphenylphosphine in an inert solvent. Often it is generated in situ. Triphenylphosphine dibromide is usually depicted as a phosphonium salt with tetrahedral phosphorus cation. According to X-ray crystallography, solid structures can feature halogen bonding.

Illustrative of its use is the conversion of 2-naphthol to 2-bromonaphthalene:

C_{10}H_{7}(OH) + (C_{6}H_{5})_{3}PBr_{2} → C_{10}H_{7}Br + (C_{6}H_{5})_{3}PO + HBr
