= 2-Chloronaphthalene =

Names
- Preferred IUPAC name 2-Chloronaphthalene
- Other names β-Chloronaphthalene, 2-Chloro-naphthalene

Identifiers
CAS Number	91-58-7
3D model (JSmol)	Interactive image
ChemSpider	6789
ECHA InfoCard	100.001.891
EC Number	202-079-9
PubChem CID	7056
UNII	49O81U3ITI
CompTox Dashboard (EPA)	DTXSID8023971
- InChI: InChI=1/C10H7Cl/c11-10-6-5-8-3-1-2-4-9(8)7-10/h1-7 Key: CGYGETOMCSJHJU-UHFFFAOYSA-N
- SMILES: ClC1=CC=C2C=CC=CC2=C1

Properties
Chemical formula	C_{10}H_{7}Cl
Molar mass	162.62 g·mol^{−1}
Appearance	Off-white crystalline powder
Density	1.2±0.1 g/cm^{3}
Melting point	59 °C (138 °F; 332 K)
Boiling point	255 °C (491 °F; 528 K)
Solubility in water	insoluble

Hazards
- GHS labelling
Pictograms	(GHS07: Exclamation mark)
Signal word	Warning
Hazard statements	H315, H319, H335
Precautionary statements	P261, P280
- Except where otherwise noted, data are given for materials in their standard state (at 25 °C [77 °F], 100 kPa). Infobox references

2-Chloronaphthalene is an organochlorine chemical compound, a chlorinated derivative of naphthalene. Its chemical formula is C_{10}H_{7}Cl. The compound is an isomer for 1-chloronaphthalene.

== Synthesis ==
2-Chloronaphthalene is obtained directly by chlorination of naphthalene, with the formation of more highly substituted derivatives such as dichloro- and trichloronaphthalenes, in addition to the two monochlorinated isomeric compounds: 1-chloronaphthalene and 2-chloronaphthalene.

== Properties ==
2-Chloronaphthalene is a combustible, off-white odorless solid, which is practically insoluble in water. The compound may react with strong oxidizing agents.

== Applications ==
2-Chloronaphthalene can be used for the production of fullerenes.

== See also ==
- 1-Fluoronaphthalene
- 1-Bromonaphthalene
