= Nicotyrine =

Names
- IUPAC name 3-(1-methylpyrrol-2-yl)pyridine
- Other names: alpha-nicotyrine; beta-nicotyrine; ss-nicotyrine; 3,2'-nicotyrine

Identifiers
CAS Number	487-19-4
3D model (JSmol)	Interactive image
ChEBI	CHEBI:7564
ChEMBL	ChEMBL1522291
ChemSpider	2282468
ECHA InfoCard	100.006.956
EC Number	207-651-1
KEGG	C10161
PubChem CID	10249
UNII	XN4R1LH79Y
CompTox Dashboard (EPA)	DTXSID3075048
- InChI: InChI=1S/C10H10N2/c1-12-7-3-5-10(12)9-4-2-6-11-8-9/h2-8H,1H3 Key: RYFOJXFXERAMLS-UHFFFAOYSA-N
- SMILES: CN1C=CC=C1C2=CN=CC=C2

Properties
Chemical formula	C_{10}H_{10}N_{2}
Molar mass	158.204 g·mol^{−1}
- Except where otherwise noted, data are given for materials in their standard state (at 25 °C [77 °F], 100 kPa). Infobox references

Nicotryine is lesser known and minor tobacco alkaloid. It inhibits metabolism of nicotine through CYP2A6 enzyme inhibition (K_{i} = 7.5 ± 2.9). It also inhibits CYP2A13 (K_{i} = 5.6 ± 0.86) which might play role in nicotine metabolism. Nicotyrine is formed by gradual oxidation of nicotine in e-liquids and causes delayed nicotine clearance and attenuated withdrawal symptoms.

It has insecticidal properties like nicotine and certain derivatives have been synthesized for that property.

== Chemistry ==
alpha-nicotyrine and beta-nicotyrine are positional isomers of each other.

=== Synthesis ===
Nicotyrine can be produced readily from nicotine by catalytic dehydrogenation and from tobacco biomass by catalytic pyrolysis.

== See also ==
- Myosmine
