= 1-Fluoronaphthalene =

Names
- Preferred IUPAC name 1-Fluoronaphthalene
- Other names α-fluoronaphthalene

Identifiers
CAS Number	321-38-0
3D model (JSmol)	Interactive image
ChemSpider	9078
ECHA InfoCard	100.005.717
EC Number	206-287-0
PubChem CID	9450
UNII	0920702UT7
CompTox Dashboard (EPA)	DTXSID7059808
- InChI: InChI=1S/C10H7F/c11-10-7-3-5-8-4-1-2-6-9(8)10/h1-7H Key: CWLKTJOTWITYSI-UHFFFAOYSA-N
- SMILES: C1=CC=C2C(=C1)C=CC=C2F

Properties
Chemical formula	C_{10}H_{7}F
Appearance	Colorless liquid
Melting point	−13 °C (9 °F; 260 K)
Boiling point	215 °C (419 °F; 488 K)
Solubility in water	insoluble

Hazards
- GHS labelling
Pictograms	(GHS07: Exclamation mark)
Signal word	Warning
Flash point	65 °C (149 °F; 338 K)
- Except where otherwise noted, data are given for materials in their standard state (at 25 °C [77 °F], 100 kPa). Infobox references

1-Fluornaphthalene is an organofluorine chemical compound from the group of naphthalene derivatives and fluoroaromatics. Its chemical formula is C_{10}H_{7}F.

== Synthesis ==
1-Fluoronaphthalene can be obtained by reacting naphthalene with Selectfluor.

== Properties ==
1-Fluoronaphthalene is a colorless, combustible liquid, which is insoluble in water.

== Applications ==
1-Fluoronaphthalene was used for the tert-butyllithium-mediated synthesis of 6-substituted phenanthridines. It has also been used in the synthesis of LY248686, a potent inhibitor of serotonin and norepinephrine uptake.

1-Fluoronaphthalene is also used as a component of the Organic Check Material mounted in canisters on Mars Science Laboratory Curiosity rover. It's used for calibrating the Sample Analysis at Mars (SAM) instrument suite, being a synthetic organic compound not found in nature on Earth and not expected on Mars.

== See also ==
- 1-Bromonaphthalene
- 1-Chloronaphthalene
