= 2-Bromonaphthalene =

Identifiers
CAS Number	580-13-2
3D model (JSmol)	Interactive image
ChEMBL	ChEMBL192643
ChemSpider	10894
ECHA InfoCard	100.008.594
EC Number	209-452-5
PubChem CID	11372
UNII	SYU33I753N
CompTox Dashboard (EPA)	DTXSID3060378
- InChI: InChI=1S/C10H7Br/c11-10-6-5-8-3-1-2-4-9(8)7-10/h1-7H Key: APSMUYYLXZULMS-UHFFFAOYSA-N
- SMILES: C1=CC=C2C=C(C=CC2=C1)Br

Properties
Chemical formula	C_{10}H_{7}Br
Molar mass	207.070 g·mol^{−1}
Appearance	white solid
Melting point	45–50 °C (113–122 °F; 318–323 K)
Boiling point	281–283 °C (538–541 °F; 554–556 K)
Vapor pressure	0.00347 mmHg

Hazards
- GHS labelling
Pictograms	(GHS07: Exclamation mark)
Signal word	Warning
Hazard statements	H302, H319
Precautionary statements	P264, P264+P265, P270, P280, P301+P317, P305+P351+P338, P330, P337+P317, P501
- Except where otherwise noted, data are given for materials in their standard state (at 25 °C [77 °F], 100 kPa). Infobox references

2-Bromonaphthalene is an organic compound with the formula C_{10}H_{7}Br. It is one of two isomeric monobromonaphthalenes, the other being 1-bromonaphthalene. Under normal conditions, the substance is a colorless solid.

== Synthesis and reactions ==
It is prepared by treatment of 2-naphthol with triphenylphosphine dibromide:

C_{10}H_{7}(OH) + (C_{6}H_{5})_{3}PBr_{2} → C_{10}H_{7}Br + (C_{6}H_{5})_{3}PO + HBr

It can also be prepared by a Sandmeyer reaction from 2-aminonaphthalene.

It forms a Grignard reagent.
