= 1-Bromonaphthalene =

Names
- Preferred IUPAC name 1-Bromonaphthalene
- Other names α-Bromonaphthalene

Identifiers
CAS Number	90-11-9
3D model (JSmol)	Interactive image
ChemSpider	6735
ECHA InfoCard	100.001.787
EC Number	201-965-2
MeSH	C108222
PubChem CID	7001
UNII	976Y53P08P
CompTox Dashboard (EPA)	DTXSID30861681
- InChI: InChI=1S/C10H7Br/c11-10-7-3-5-8-4-1-2-6-9(8)10/h1-7H Key: DLKQHBOKULLWDQ-UHFFFAOYSA-N; InChI=1/C10H7Br/c11-10-7-3-5-8-4-1-2-6-9(8)10/h1-7H Key: DLKQHBOKULLWDQ-UHFFFAOYAA
- SMILES: c1ccc2c(c1)cccc2Br

Properties
Chemical formula	C_{10}H_{7}Br
Molar mass	207.070 g·mol^{−1}
Appearance	Colorless liquid
Density	1.48 g/mL
Melting point	1–2 °C (34–36 °F; 274–275 K)
Boiling point	132–135 °C at 12 mm; 145–148 °C at 20 mm
- Except where otherwise noted, data are given for materials in their standard state (at 25 °C [77 °F], 100 kPa). Infobox references

1-Bromonaphthalene is an organic compound with the formula C_{10}H_{7}Br.

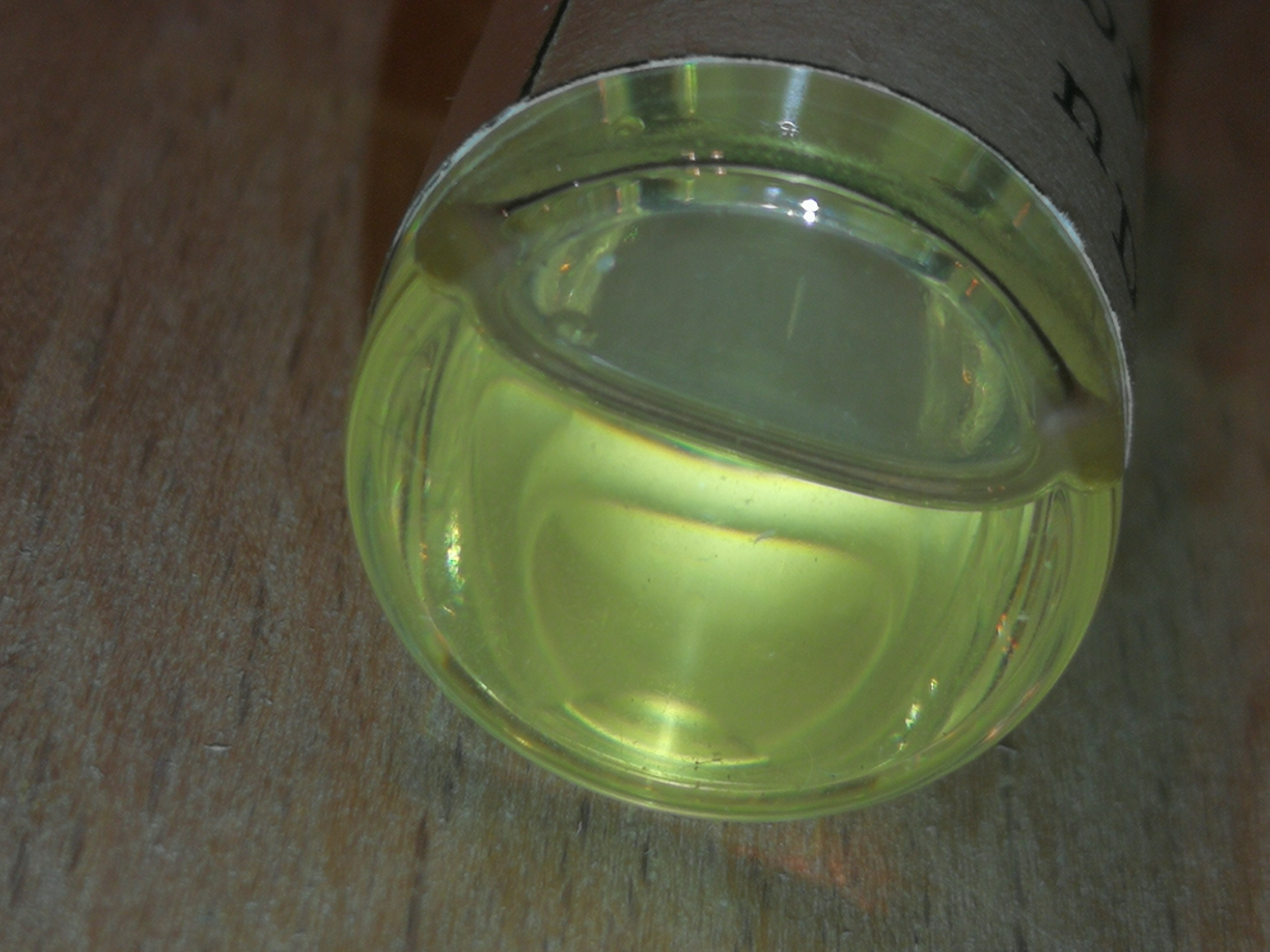
1-Bromonaphthalene

It is one of two isomeric bromonaphthalenes, the other being 2-bromonaphthalene. Under normal conditions, the substance is a colorless liquid.

== Synthesis and reactions ==
It is prepared by treatment of naphthalene with bromine:

C_{10}H_{8} + Br_{2} → C_{10}H_{7}Br + HBr

The compound exhibits many reactions typical of aryl bromides. Bromide can be displaced by cyanide to give the nitrile.

It forms a Grignard reagent and organolithium compound.

Analogous to the synthesis of phenyllithium is the conversion of 1-bromonaphthalene to 1-lithionaphthalene, by lithium–halogen exchange:

C_{10}H_{7}Br + BuLi → C_{10}H_{7}Li + BuBr (Bu = butyl)

The resulting 1-lithionaphthalene undergoes a second lithiation, in contrast to the behavior of phenyllithium. The 1,8-dilithio derivative is a precursor to a host of peri-naphthalene derivatives.

== Applications ==
The compound is also used as a precursor to various substituted naphthalenes, but substituted bromonaphthalenes are more important commercially.

Because of its high refractive index (1.656-1.659_{nD}), 1-bromonaphthalene is used as an embedding agent in microscopy and for determining the refraction of crystals.

== See also ==
- 2-Bromonaphthalene
- 1-Chloronaphthalene
- 1-Fluoronaphthalene
