= Dinitronaphthalene =

Dinitronaphthalene refers to organic compounds with the formula C_{10}H_{6}(NO_{2})_{2}.

They are colorless or pale yellow solids. A mixture of the 1,6, and 1,8 isomers are produced by nitration of naphthalene, illustrating the tendency of electrophiles to attack separate rings on the naphthalene. The 1,4-isomer is prepared by a less direct route from 1-nitro-4-aminonaphthalene via a diazonium intermediate.

- 1,4-Dinitronaphthalene (RN 6921-26-2), m.p. 134 °C
- 1,6-Dinitronaphthalene (RN 605-71-0), m.p. 219 °C
- 1,8-Dinitronaphthalene (RN 602-38-0), m.p. 172 °C

== See also ==
- Nitronaphthalene
