= 1-Chloronaphthalene =

Names
- Preferred IUPAC name 1-Chloronaphthalene

Identifiers
CAS Number	90-13-1
3D model (JSmol)	Interactive image; Interactive image
ChEMBL	ChEMBL195338
ChemSpider	6737
ECHA InfoCard	100.001.789
PubChem CID	7003
UNII	K4OIF2EC56
CompTox Dashboard (EPA)	DTXSID2024791
- InChI: InChI=1S/C10H7Cl/c11-10-7-3-5-8-4-1-2-6-9(8)10/h1-7H Key: JTPNRXUCIXHOKM-UHFFFAOYSA-N; InChI=1/C10H7Cl/c11-10-7-3-5-8-4-1-2-6-9(8)10/h1-7H Key: JTPNRXUCIXHOKM-UHFFFAOYAV
- SMILES: Clc2cccc1ccccc12; c1ccc2c(c1)cccc2Cl

Properties
Chemical formula	C_{10}H_{7}Cl
Molar mass	162.62 g·mol^{−1}
Melting point	−20 °C (−4 °F; 253 K)
Boiling point	263 °C (505 °F; 536 K)

Hazards
- GHS labelling
Pictograms	(GHS07: Exclamation mark) (GHS09: Environmental hazard)
Signal word	Warning
Hazard statements	H302, H410
Precautionary statements	P273
Flash point	121 °C (250 °F; 394 K)
Safety data sheet (SDS)	Oxford MSDS
- Except where otherwise noted, data are given for materials in their standard state (at 25 °C [77 °F], 100 kPa). verify (what is ?) Infobox references

1-Chloronaphthalene is an aromatic compound. It is a colorless, oily liquid which may be used to determine the refractive index of crystals by immersion. The compound is an isomer to 2-chloronaphthalene.

== Synthesis ==
1-Chloronaphthalene is obtained directly by chlorination of naphthalene, with the formation of more highly substituted derivatives such as dichloro- and trichloronaphthalenes in addition to the two monochlorinated isomeric compounds: 1-chloronaphthalene and 2-chloronaphthalene.

== Applications ==
This toxic, nonpolar organochlorine compound is sometimes used as a powerful biocide, and is also known as Basileum. It occasionally serves as insecticide and fungicide in the timber floors of shipping containers, where it fulfills the same role as chlordane.

1-Chloronaphthalene was also used as a common solvent for oils, fats and DDT until the 1970s. It is also used to determine the refractive index of crystals.

== See also ==
- 1-Fluoronaphthalene
- 1-Bromonaphthalene
