= Lower Rio Grande Valley National Wildlife Refuge =

National Wildlife Refuge in Texas, United States

- IUCN category IV (habitat/species management area)
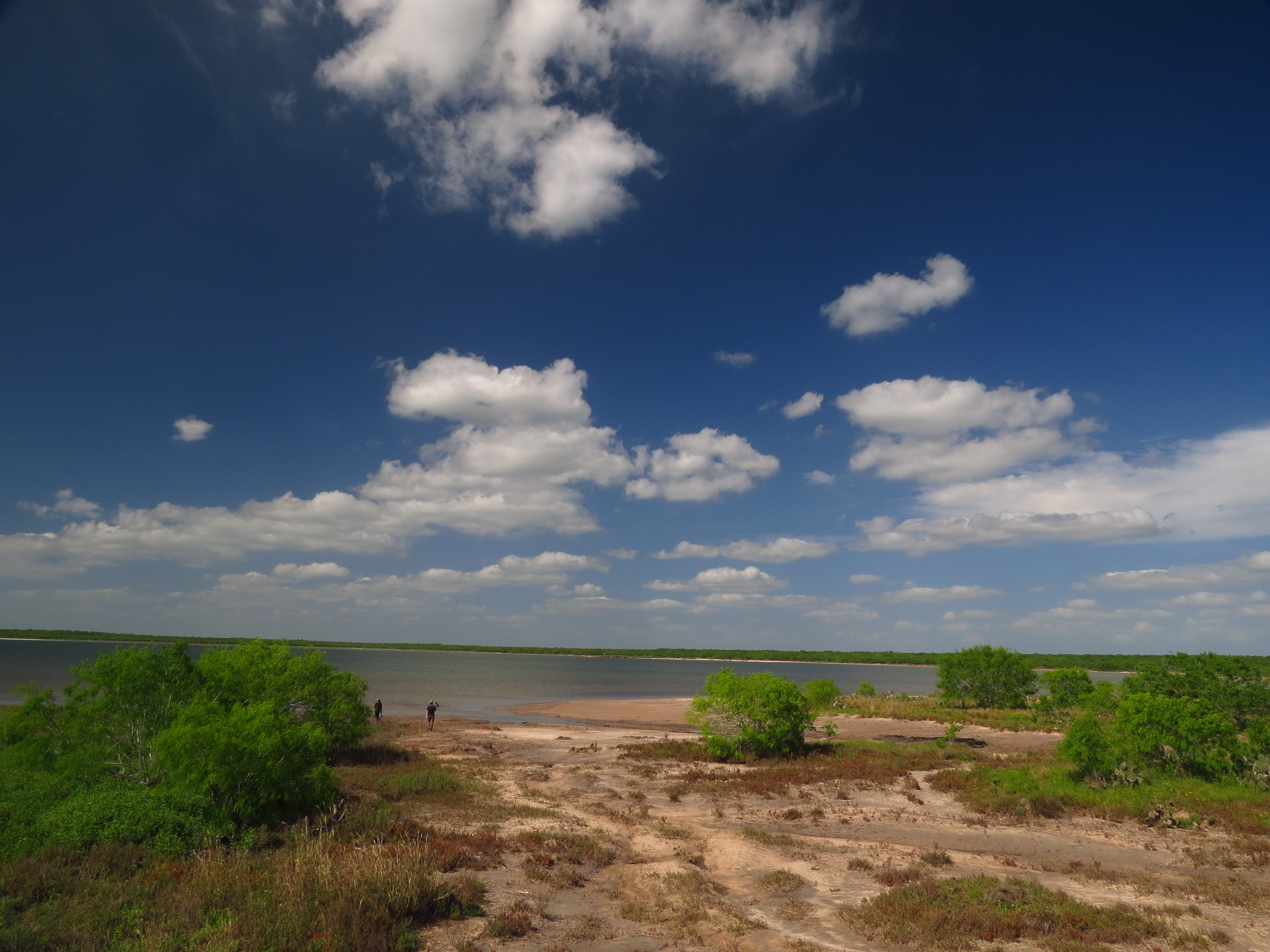
- El Sal Del Rey inside the Lower Rio Grande Valley National Wildlife Refuge

- Location within the United States Location within Texas
- Location: Cameron, Hidalgo, Starr, Zapata counties, Texas, United States
- Nearest city: La Feria, Texas
- Coordinates: 26°11′14″N 97°51′06″W
- Area: 90,788 acres (367.41 km^{2})
- Established: 1979
- Governing body: U.S. Fish and Wildlife Service
- Website: Lower Rio Grande Valley National Wildlife Refuge

The Lower Rio Grande Valley National Wildlife Refuge is a 90,788-acre (367.41 km^{2}) non-contiguous National Wildlife Refuge located in the Lower Rio Grande Valley region of southern Texas.

It is along the northern banks and reaches of the Lower Rio Grande, north of the Mexico—United States international border.

== Ecology ==
Only 5% of the native riparian, floodplain, and wetland habitats remain along the lower Rio Grande and its local tributaries, but the diversity within these fragments adds up to a significant 1,200 species of native plants, 700 species of vertebrates (including nearly 500 bird species), and 300 species of butterflies. Eleven different biological communities exist on the National Wildlife Refuge, from the Chihuahuan Desert thorn forest to tidal wetlands.

Wildlife includes the endangered ocelot, crested caracara, Mexican bluewing butterfly, great kiskadee, red-billed pigeon, Altamira oriole, ringed kingfisher, and green jay.

The refuge is designated as part of the Great Texas Coastal Birding Trail, a network of wildlife-viewing sites throughout the Texas coastal regions.

Hunting permits are issued for native white-tailed deer, feral hogs, and introduced nilgai, which are a species of antelope native to India.

== See also ==
- National Wildlife Refuges in Texas
