= Selected timeline related to orphan wells in Alberta =

Dynamic timeline related to orphan wells in Alberta

Selected timeline related to orphan wells in Alberta, Canada is a list of events relevant to orphan wells in Alberta, Canada. Orphan wells are inactive oil or gas well sites that have no solvent owner that can be held legally or financially accountable for the decommissioning and reclamation obligations to ensure public safety and to address environmental liabilities.

== 1910s ==
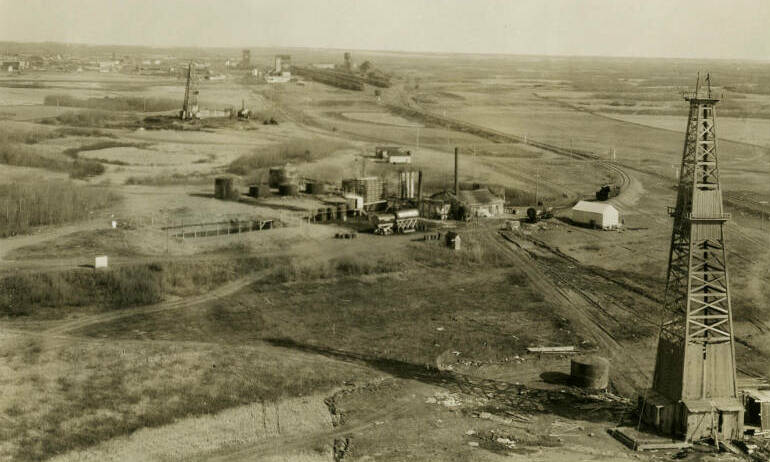
Alberta oil derricks, 1920s

1910s The province's oldest inactive well has been dormant and unreclaimed since June 30, 1918.

== 1920s ==
1920s Some of the legacy sites were in operation in the 1920s or earlier, and have no known operator and no "financial security to cover the cleanup costs."

== 1940s ==
- 1940s Alberta's oil industry experienced a big boom.

== 1950s ==
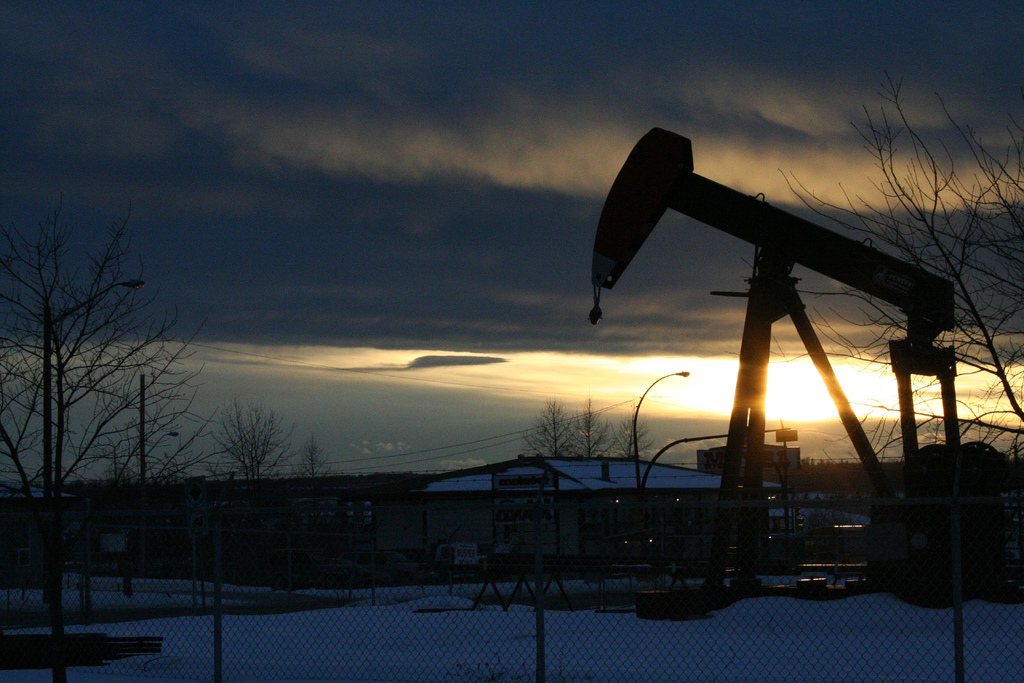
The small hamlet of Drayton Valley grew rapidly after Pembina oil was discovered in 1954, and became Alberta's first model oil town. This was the period when many wells were drilled; by 2017, there were approximately 400,000 in Alberta.

Canada's oil production in 1946 was only 21,000 barrels (3,300 m^{3}) of oil per day. By 1956, Alberta was producing 400,000 barrels (64,000 m^{3}) per day.

- 1950s The boom in Alberta's oil industry continued.

== 1960s ==
- 1960s One of Alberta's most significant "busts" in the boom and bust cycle.

== 1970s ==
- 1970s Alberta's oil industry experienced a big boom.

== 1980s ==
- 1980s One of Alberta's most significant "busts" that lasted about a decade.

== 1990s ==
- Alberta's oil industry experienced a big boom.
- 1991 June 12 In Panamericana v. Northern Badger Oil & Gas Ltd. the Court of Appeal of Alberta ruled that "abandonment of oil and gas wells is part of the general law of Alberta enacted to protect the environment and for the health and safety of all citizens."
- 1999 There were about 40,000 inactive wells in Alberta; by about 2008, there were 60,000, and by 2018, there were 89,217.

== 2000s ==
  - January The Alberta Energy and Utilities Board (EUB) established the Public Safety and Sour Gas (PSSG) independent committee to "review and assess the province's regulatory regime as it related to health and safety". Sour gas contains significant amounts of hydrogen sulfide (H_{2}S) which is toxic to animals. There were more than "6,000 sour gas wells, approximately 250 sour gas processing plants and over 18,000 km of operating sour gas pipelines" in the province. The PSSG spent a year consulting with communities that were impacted by sour gas extraction, including 16 Aboriginal communities with the aim of improving regulation of sour gas to reduce its negative effects on public health and safety.
- 2001 to 2004 Encana and other energy companies "carpet-bombed"—drilled "thousands of shallow wells"— in Alberta's Wheatland County, in communities such as Redland and Rosebud, Alberta —in "coal-bed methane and sand formations." In Ernst v. EnCana Corporation, an unsuccessful 2007 gross negligence $33-million lawsuit filed against Encana, the Alberta government, and the provincial regulator, Energy Resources Conservation Board, the litigant said that "well water was contaminated with explosive volumes of methane and other chemicals". While the lawsuit failed, it was a catalyst for the taxpayer-funded $10 million dollar project to pipe water into the communities where the wells had been drilled, as their ground water was so heavily contaminated.
- 2002 The industry-led Orphan Well Association (OWA) was established. It is an independent, non-profit organization.
- 2002 Perpetual Energy Inc. was created as a spin out of Paramount Resources, owned by Clayton Riddell. Riddell served as Perpetual's Chairman until his death in 2018. Riddell owned 41.7% of Perpetual Energy Inc. and his daughter, Susan Riddell Rose, who is Perpetual's CEO, owned 4.8%.
- 2006 More than 33% of the province's "annual natural gas production was sour gas (1.6 trillion cubic feet)".

== 2010s ==
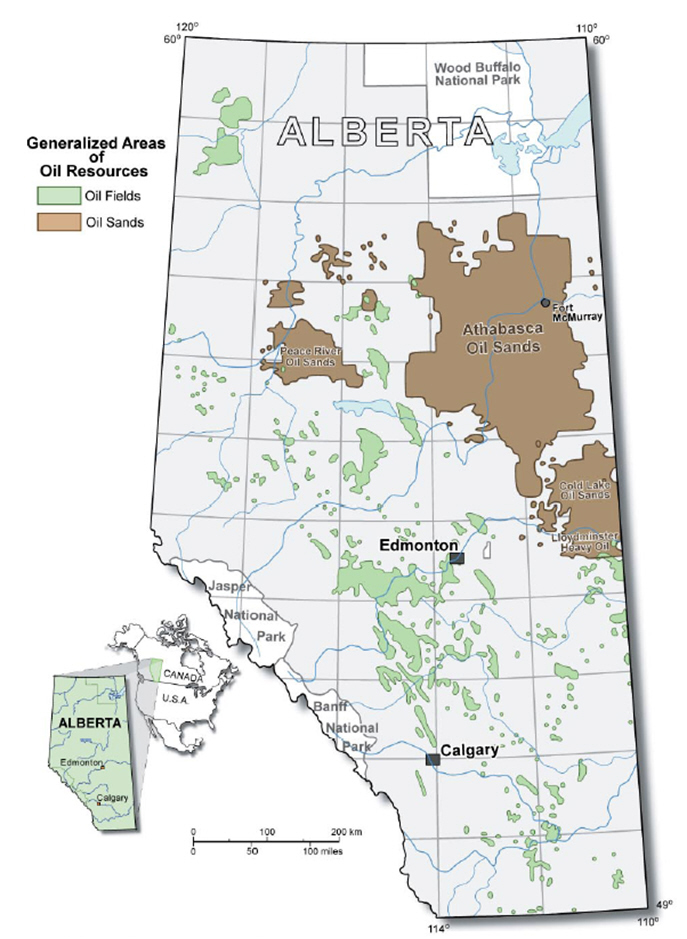
The area in green, as of 2010, shows only a fraction of the oil fields in Alberta, where 400,000 wells dot the entire province—drilled for conventional oil. By 2022, only 156,031 of these wells were active. The area in brown, the Athabasca oil sands, now produces most of the oil in Alberta, which is unconventional oil.

- 2010s Global oil price decreased in the 2010s
- 2012 The OWA only had 14 classified orphan wells; in 2013 there were 74; in 2014 there were 162; in 2015 there were 705.
  - During the last bust period in the cycle—from 2012 to 2017—the number of orphan wells increased from 74 in 2012 to 3,200.
  - There were fewer than 300 orphan wells designated orphan wells on the Orphan Well Inventory.
  - In 2012, Lexin had acquired most of its assets from Compton Petroleum Corp, a public company starting in 1996, which was once one of the largest intermediate oil and gas producers in Calgary. In 2006, Compton's capital spending was earmarked at $526 million. During a failed attempt at selling the company in 2008, Compton's shares fell from $12.80 a share to $2.60 within months. In 2012, when Compton was acquired by then New York-based MFC Industrial Ltd., Compton's capital spending was earmarked at just $14 million to $16 million. MFC Industrial at that time had a "record of spinning value out of troubled assets". Michael Smith, then Chairman of MFC, became director of the Mazeppa gas plant, a Lexin subsidiary.
- In 2014, there were 162 orphan wells.
  - From 2014 to 2016 global oil prices experienced the "largest...declines in modern history". This led to the longest decline in oil prices since the 1980s.
- 2015 AER representatives reported to a meeting of Oklahoma's Interstate Oil and Gas Compact Commission meeting on surface casing vent flow (SCVF) and gas migration (GM) that by the end of 2015, there was a total of 600,000 wells drilled in Alberta, Saskatchewan, and Manitoba.
  - January 28 The appendix, "Methane from Leaking Abandoned Wells: Health and Safety Issues", for the 2016 AER report was completed by Monique G. Dubé.
  - There were 705 wells in the OWA's inventory.
  - In 2015, there were about 800 oil and gas licensees in the province who contributed annually to the OWA levy. This includes the 17 major energy companies as well as smaller "mom and pop companies".
  - The average cost of reclamation/remediation (R/R) site services in 2015 was $180,000 per site and range from $20,000 to $1 million. This provides work during downturns in the oil industry.
  - When Redwater Energy declared bankruptcy in 2015 and said they could not clean up over a thousand orphan wells, this raised environmental concerns in what the CBC reported as a "tsunami of orphaned oil and gas wells" from 200 in 2014 to "3,127 wells that need to be plugged or abandoned, and a further 1,553 sites that have been abandoned but still need to be reclaimed". On January 31, 2019, in the case of Redwater Energy, the Supreme Court of Canada ruled 5–2 overturning "two lower court decisions that said bankruptcy law has paramountcy over provincial environmental responsibilities". The Supreme Court of Canada "allowed an appeal brought by the AER and the OWA from the decision of the Alberta Court of Appeal in Orphan Well Association v Grant Thornton Limited (Redwater). The "case has been one of the most closely watched by the Canadian oil and gas industry in decades". Redwater lawyers said that it was not possible for the company to comply with both the federal and provincial legislation in regards to the Bankruptcy and Insolvency Act (BIA). The January 31 ruling means that "bankruptcy is not a licence to ignore environmental regulations, and there is no inherent conflict between federal bankruptcy laws and provincial environmental regulations."
  - In 2015, two Alberta courts found in favour of the oil and gas company Redwater Energy's receiver against the AER. Redwater had filed for bankruptcy as a result of the "oil price collapse" and the AER wanted to recuperate funds from the any sales Redwater made, to "help pay to clean up after Redwater's inactive wells as required by provincial regulations". By going into bankruptcy, Redwater avoided paying for its Asset retirement obligations (ARO).
  - In 2015, nine different contractors working on projects at Mazeppa filed a lawsuit against the Lexin subsidiary. Smith disputed the contractors' claim. By 2015, MFC Industrial Ltd. had changed its name MFC Bancorp Ltd., its focus to merchant banking with its listing as a trading company in Vancouver, BC, and its commercial headquarters in Austria. As a result, by 2015, the southern Alberta oil and gas properties' ownership became "complex and opaque." In October 2015, the new ownership group stopped annual surface lease compensation pay to hundreds of landowners in southern Alberta where the company had "Lexin wells". Landowners who wished to complain were directed to the company's office in Hong Kong. The landowners were encouraged to recover the unpaid compensation from the Surface Rights Board instead of the ownership group. According to financial records cited in the Calgary Herald, in late 2015, Bancroft had sold a controlling interest in these southern Alberta assets to an " undisclosed buyer"—then listed as having zero net value. Calgary Herald reported that, as of 2017, company statements and court records show that the Austrian-headquartered MFC Bancorp as Lexin company trustee, was still the "controlling registered shareholder."
- 2016 It is alleged in a court filing that in 2016 Susan Riddell Rose "engineered the sale of a subsidiary called Perpetual Energy Operating Corp. (PEOC), later renamed Sequoia", to Chinese investors.
  - In May 2016, the Court of Queen's Bench of Alberta (ABQB) in 2016 ABQB 278, "confirmed that the federal Bankruptcy and Insolvency Act supersedes the provincial requirements that companies must clean up wells." "Bankrupt companies can avoid their liabilities and leave them as a public obligation."
  - By November 2016, when Mazeppa gas plant contractors won their lawsuit against a Lexin subsidiaries—LR Processing Partnership and LR Processing Ltd.—forcing them into receivership, the company appealed. AER received complaints in 2016 from a number of concerned employees about Lexin's cost-saving neglect of required maintenance resulting operational safety issues. When Lexin Resources was shut down, reasons cited included concerns about the environment and safety issues. Following the AER's decision, the industry-led OWA took on the responsibility of ensuring that Lexin's 1,200 wells were "shuttered and safe" while awaiting the outcome, which could mean new buyers of wells or Lexin's compliance with the rules and its resumption of control of its assets.
  - November 26 Monique G. Dubé presented AER with the 33-page preliminary analysis, "D79 Abandoned Well Methane Toxicity Assessment", on behalf of AER's Environmental Science Branch and Closure and Liability Branch, which included a map view of AER's Abandoned Wells. The AER assessment identified about 1,500 abandoned wells in urban centers. This includes wells with various license status, including Abandoned, Reclamation Certified and Reclamation Exempt. In rural areas, the assessment identified about 170,000 abandoned wells.
  - In May 2016, the Court of Queen's Bench of Alberta (ABQB) in 2016 ABQB 278, "confirmed that the federal Bankruptcy and Insolvency Act supersedes the provincial requirements that companies must clean up wells." "Bankrupt companies can avoid their liabilities and leave them as a public obligation."[16]: 8
  - Court of Appeal of Alberta then overturned the decision ruling that environmental obligations were less of a priority that the debts owed. The Redwater case is an example of how the conflict of those two jurisdictions come into play—Oil and Gas Conservation Act (OGCA) is the provincial statute or law dealing with licensing, producing, and managing aspects of all oil and gas assets in Alberta and the federal Bankruptcy and Insolvency Act (BIA).
  - Prior to 2017, the energy industry paid $15 million a year into the Orphan Fund Levy. It doubled to $30 million in 2017.
  - The Calgary, Alberta-headquartered Well Integrity And Abandonment Society (WIA)was founded by Jay Williams who also founded the Canadian Society for Gas Migration (CSGM). The CSGM focused on Service Casing Vent Flow. Both organization are composed of oil and gas professionals and their mandates focus on well bore integrity, including "well abandonment, well integrity, gas migration, ventflow, well construction, cementing, well logging, and plugs".
  - In 2017, the OWA listed "3,127 wells that need[ed] to be plugged or abandoned, and a further 1,553 sites that have been abandoned but still need[ed] to be reclaimed". It is similar in approach to the Canadian Society for Gas Migration (CSGM) consists of a variety of professionals from throughout the oil and

gas industry, all with the focus of mitigating gas migration and surface casing vent flow issues throughout not only Alberta, but Canada as a whole

  - Between 1955 and 2017, approximately 580,000 wells were drilled in Canada, according to a Natural Resources Canada (NRC) report on wellbore integrity in the oil and gas industry in Canada. Of these, 400,000 were in Alberta and the NRC anticipated that there would be 100,000s more drilled.
  - OWA reported that with a total expenditure of $30 million in 2017, only 232 inactive orphan wells were plugged or sealed. The remediation and reclamation on these well sites still needed to be completed before the wells can be certified as reclaimed. The OWA inventory included 3,127 inactive orphan wells that needed to be to be plugged or abandoned and 1,553 others that needed to be reclaimed.
  - The New Democratic Party (NDP) provincial government began consulting with the energy industry in 2017 to "introduce new rules that might limit a multi-billion-dollar public liability for reclaiming about 80,000 inactive wells around Alberta."
  - The C.D. Howe Institute report estimated that the social cost of orphan wells, including those incurred by financially insolvent firms, could be more than $8.6 billion.
  - In 2017, the Government of Canada provided Alberta with a one-time grant of $30 million for "activities associated with decommissioning and reclamation". In that year, the provincial government used the federal funds to "cover the interest on a $235 million repayable loan" which the oil and gas industry will repay over the next nine years, to support the OWA's efforts.
- 2017 About 50% of the newly orphaned wells were the result of 2017 MFC/Lexin 1,400 wells OWA transfer. Nearly 30 companies regulated by AER were insolvent.
  - September There were 3,000 designated orphan wells on the Orphan Well Inventory, 450,000 wells registered in Alberta with about 155,000 "no longer producing but not yet fully remediated".
  - A long-form Calgary Herald article provided details on the "complex and opaque" ownership of the company by the MFC group of companies, of which Lexin is a subsidiary.
  - The rare February 2017 AER enforcement action—the largest suspension AER ever made—sparked questions over the problem of orphan wells. When AER suspended over 1,600 licenses of Lexin Resources Ltd., the limited liability company was forced into receivership, and the OWA assumed temporary custody of these wells. AER had begun to receive concerns submitted by company employees in early 2016, then forwarded to Occupational Health and Safety, including concerns of spillage of a substance that converts gas into sulphur on the plant floor at the MFC Resource Partnership's Mazeppa Gas Plant. AER vice-president, Mark Taylor, said that their goal was to ensure public safety, and to contain both environmental and financial risks. The company had said that it would not be able to maintain its sour gas wells as of mid-February.
  - An April 5, 2017 article in the Financial Post reported that the AER was "suing insolvent" Lexin Resources Ltd., a "relatively small natural gas producer in southern Alberta" to "recover money it is allegedly owed." The AER claims that, "It is not open for a licensee, when times get tough, to transfer the burdens associated with holding AER licenses to the AER and/or the OWA." Lexin Resources Ltd owned "1,514 well licenses — many in partnership with 51 other energy companies." Once abandoned they fall under the management of industry-led agency, the OWA, which would double the number of OWA wells. Grant Thornton, Lexin's court-appointed receiver According to the Post, fifty-one companies, including Canadian Natural Resources Ltd., ExxonMobil Canada, and Husky Energy, who own some of Lexin Resources Ltd. assets, may share the responsibility for Lexin's AROs.
  - The case was one of the most closely watched by the Canadian oil and gas industry and by the insolvency industry.
  - On April 25, 2017, the Court of Appeal of Alberta (ABCA) dismissed the AER and OWA's appeal in a landmark decision, affirming the May 2016 decision of the Court of Queen's Bench of Alberta in favour of Redwater Energy Corporation's receiver, Grant Thornton Limited, in Redwater's bankruptcy proceedings. The ABCA found that Grant Thornton Limited was "entitled to disclaim Redwater's non-producing oil wells and sell its producing ones".
  - The New Democratic Party (NDP) provincial government began consulting with the energy industry to "introduce new rules that might limit a multi-billion-dollar public liability for reclaiming about 80,000 inactive wells around Alberta."
  - The federal government provided a grant of $30 million for decommissioning and reclamation projects. The provincial government used the federal funds to advance a loan of $235 million loan to the OAW to be paid back by industry over a ten-year period. The $30 million covered the interest.
  - When there is a decrease in the price of oil, the number of insolvent energy companies increase. When there is no licensed owner responsible for maintenance of the oil and gas wells, facilities and pipelines, these orphaned wells become the responsibility of the industry-led Orphan Wells Association. In c. 2012, there were fewer than 300 orphan wells. By September 2017, there were 3,000.
  - In 2017, there were 450,000 wells registered in Alberta with about 155,000 "no longer producing but not yet fully remediated".
  - In February 2017, in response to concerns about public safety, environmental and financial risks, the industry-led Alberta Energy Regulator (AER) cancelled the licenses for 1,600 wells controlled and owned by the parent MFC ownership group through a small limited liability subsidiary, Lexin Resources Ltd.
  - In their 2017 annual report, the OWA anticipated an increase in orphan properties as nearly 30 companies regulated by AER were insolvent. The number of wells which have been plugged but not remedied is 1062. About 50% of the newly orphaned wells were the result of 2017 MFC/Lexin 1,400 wells OWA transfer.
- 2018 As of 2018, 37.8% of all inactive wells—89,217—had been inactive for up to 5 years; 29.8% had been inactive for 5 to 10 years; 16% from 10 to 15 years; 8.2% from 15 to 20 years; 3.9% from 20 to 25 years; and 4.5% had been inactive for over 25 year.
  - According to a 2018 article in the Financial Post, "farmers, ranchers and their lawyers" with these wells on their property, are concerned that an "additional 93,805 inactive wells could become orphaned given Alberta's economic outlook."
  - Based on the OWA's 2018 data, at the current level of the orphan well inventory, the cost of well abandonment and reclamation of their inventory of orphan wells was expected to be around $611 million. However, this estimate of $611 million does not include potential orphan wells. In this context, potential candidates include wells owned by financially insolvent firms and nearly insolvent firms.
  - AER falsely reported to the public that the oil industry's "accumulated environmental liability" was about $58.65 billion. It was later revealed that the actual amount of unfunded cleanup liabilities would amount to $260-billion based on "internal AER calculations" in "a hypothetical worst-case scenario". Tailings pond clean-up represented the "largest but unknown portion of this AER estimate". In response, then AER CEO Jim Ellis apologized for failing to report "that cleaning up after the province’s oil and gas industry would cost $260 billion" and announced his retirement as CE0.
  - The cost of abandonment and remediation per well can be estimated from reviewing the OWA's annual report; those costs are estimated to be $61,000 and $20,000 per well respectively.
  - In 2018 the OWA listed 3,700 in their inventory of orphan wells.
  - As a result of the bankruptcy of Sequoia Resources, its liabilities, including 4,000 wells, pipelines and other facilities", became the OWA's responsibility.
  - February Sequoia Resources Ltd, an oil and gas firm that had purchased "licences for 2,300 wells" notified AER that it was ceasing operations "imminently" and was unable to maintain "almost 200 facilities and nearly 700 pipeline segments". Sequoia Resources Ltd, which had defaulted on its "municipal tax payments", could reclaim all of its properties. Sequoia acquired 3,200 shallow depleted gas wells along with productive wells. There was a sharp decline in gas prices and Sequoia could not meet its obligations. AER was criticized for allowing similar acquisitions where buyers do not have adequate financing.
  - On February 15, 2018, the Supreme Court of Canada held a hearing to determine who gets paid first when an oil company becomes insolvent—creditors or abandoned well clean up. ATB Financial, the primary lender for the bankrupt Redwater Redwater Energy, a junior oil and gas company and the CAPP argued in favour of keeping the status quo, whereby creditors have priority, citing the federal Bankruptcy and Insolvency Act. ATB Financial. ATB said that other jurisdictions had regulatory policies that required oil companies to pay for the cost of future remediation before they were granted a license to drill. A CAPP lawyer said that if AER did require oil companies to pay for the cost of remediation before they drill it "would effectively sterilize" a "vast amount capital" that could otherwise be spent "in the public interest" by "exploring for, developing and producing energy."
  - On August 7, 2018 PricewaterhouseCoopers, the trustee for Chinese investors who purchased Sequoia Resources Ltd in 2016, launched a lawsuit against Perpetual Energy Inc. in an "unprecedented bid to void" the 2016 sale of Perpetual Energy Inc.'s subsidiary called Perpetual Energy Operating Corp. (PEOC) now known as Sequoia Resources Ltd to Chinese investors. (Note: Perpetual Energy Inc. was created in 2002 as a spin out of Paramount Resources, owned by Clayton Riddell, a Calgary billionaire who died in September 15, 2018. Clayton Riddell remained as Chairman of Perpetual Energy Inc. from its inception in 2002 until Riddell's passing in 2018. Riddell owned 41.7% of Perpetual Energy Inc. and his daughter, Susan Riddell Rose, who is Perpetual's CEO, owns a 4.8%. In August 2018, Perpetual Energy Inc. had a market capitalization of about $40-million. It is alleged in a court filing that in 2016 Susan Riddell Rose "engineered the sale of a subsidiary called Perpetual Energy Operating Corp. (PEOC), later renamed Sequoia" to Chinese investors. In March 2018 Sequoia filed for bankruptcy protection.) An article in The Globe and Mail said that this appears to be the "first attempt by a bankruptcy trustee in Alberta to have a previous oil and gas transaction unwound." It could "introduce major new risks to the [oil and gas] industry’s ability to buy and sell assets and could also deliver a severe blow to Perpetual." The lawsuit alleges that Perpetual and its CEO Susan Riddell Rose "knew the deal would sink the buyer". Perpetual says that "the claim is without merit".
  - March Sequoia Resources Ltd then filed for bankruptcy protection "without decommissioning and cleaning up 4,000 wells, pipelines and other facilities", as required of all oil companies.
  - August 7 PricewaterhouseCoopers, the trustee for Chinese investors who purchased Sequoia Resources Ltd in 2016, launched a lawsuit against Perpetual Energy Inc. in an "unprecedented bid to void" the 2016 sale of Perpetual Energy Inc.'s subsidiary called Perpetual Energy Operating Corp. (PEOC) now known as Sequoia Resources Ltd to Chinese investors.August Perpetual Energy Inc. had a market capitalization of about $40-million. An article in The Globe and Mail said that this appears to be the "first attempt by a bankruptcy trustee in Alberta to have a previous oil and gas transaction unwound." It could "introduce major new risks to the [oil and gas] industry’s ability to buy and sell assets and could also deliver a severe blow to Perpetual." The lawsuit alleges that Perpetual and its CEO Susan Riddell Rose "knew the deal would sink the buyer". Perpetual says that "the claim is without merit".
  - October 29 The Shanghai Sinooil Energy Corp and its subsidiary Shanghai Energy Corp made a statement of claim against 12 people including former Shanghai Energy CEO Wentao Yang and COO Kevin Richmond in a Calgary court. They were accused of falsifying documents and diverting money to Sequoia Resources Ltd. Jones wrote that Sequoia Resources Ltd "with links to China's ruling Communist Party" "was set up to acquire aging gas assets with high abandonment liabilities, starting with a package of wells purchased from Perpetual Energy in 2016".
  - According to their annual report, from its creation in 2002 until the fiscal year 2017 which ended March 2018, the OWA "decommissioned approximately 1,400 orphan wells, with more than 800 of the sites reclaimed."
  - In the fiscal year 2018, the OWA decommissioned 501 abandoned wells, with "382 wells downhole decommissioned (abandoned) and waiting on cut and cap of wellhead only". According to the OWA, by 2019, most of the orphan wells in their inventory, are "considered low risk and therefore do not require immediate closure".
- 2019 There were "still more than 15,000 wells drilled before 1964 that have not been remediated."
  - Of the 440,000 wells drilled in the province, approximately 22,000 were leaking.
  - Trident Exploration's receivership in May 2019 resulted in 3,650 wells that no longer had a solvent owners, and the loss of 94 jobs.
  - As part of Alberta's Area-Based Closure program (ABC), which represented 70% of the provinces remediation activity, the oil and gas industry spent approximately $340 million on clean up.
  - The Supreme Court of Canada (SCC) ruled in Orphan Well Association v. Grant Thornton Ltd.—the Redwater case— that in the case of a bankruptcy, a company's first priority is to fulfil its environmental obligations—not as a debt—but as a duty to "citizens and communities." With a vote of 5–2 this overturned "two lower court decisions that said bankruptcy law has paramountcy over provincial environmental responsibilities".
  - On January 31, 2019, in the case of Redwater Energy, the Supreme Court of Canada ruled 5–2 overturning "two lower court decisions that said bankruptcy law has paramountcy over provincial environmental responsibilities".
  - Trident Exploration became insolvent in leaving more than 4,000 unreclaimed wells that had been actively producing the equivalent of 10,000 barrels of oil a day.
  - As of 2019, there were about 3,406 orphan wells on the OWA inventory.

== 2020s ==
- 2020 The PBO report said that, as of 2020, there were 10,000 orphaned and abandoned wells in Alberta. Of these, about 7,400 were abandoned wells that had not yet been designated as orphan by the AER, but do not have a solvent owner. When they are added to the existing OWA's Inventory, the total will triple its current number.

May 1 The OWA's inventory listed "2963 orphan wells for abandonment, 297 orphan facilities for decommissioning, 3781 orphan pipeline segments for abandonment, 3116 orphan sites for reclamation, and 939 orphan reclaimed sites."

  - There were about 97,000 inactive wells that were not properly closed and another 71,000 abandoned wells requiring clean-up, according to a University of Calgary Policy School article.
  - The federal government provided a grant of $1.2 billion through the COVID-19 Economic Response Plan announced in 2020. Using the federal grant, in 2020, the province funded the Alberta Site Rehabilitation Program (ASRP) with $1 million in provincial loans. The oil and gas industry paid almost the same amount on clean up—$363—as they did in 2019, in spite of the federal grant.
  - As of 2020, there were 97,920 wells that were "licensed as temporarily suspended" in Alberta.
- 2021 There are 475,000 oil wells in Canada alone that will eventually need to be cleaned up and the well site reclaimed.
  - Of all the inactive wells in Alberta, 29% —27,532 wells—have been suspended for more than a decade without being either "abandoned" or reactivated, as of March 25, 2021.
  - The January 2022 Parliamentary Budget Officer (PB0) report on the cost of cleaning Canada's orphan oil and gas wells, estimated that it would cost $361 million just to clean traditional orphan wells nationally, which does not include the cost of oil sands operations.
  - PBO said that there was a gap of $178 between the AER/OWA's security deposit of $237 million in October 2021 and the total cost of clean-up of $415 million.
  - More than 50% of Alberta's wells are not producing oil or gas, yet they have not been cleaned up.
  - The OWA spent $161.5 million in the fiscal year 2021/2022 on decommissioning wells, pipelines, and facilities. In 2021/22 42% of this total went going towards well decommissioning, 30% towards site reclamation, 13% to facilities decommissioning, and 5% to pipeline decommissioning.
  - The annual Orphan Fund Association Levy for the fiscal year 2021/2022 was set at $65 million.
  - In a 2021 journal article in Environmental Science and Technology, McGill University scientists said that CAPP has no records of oil and gas wells prior to 1995, even though Canada's oil and gas industry began in the 1850s. McGill scientists working with various sources estimated that there were more than 370,000 abandoned oil and gas wells (AOG) in Canada. Agencies in the provinces and territories have not included over 60,000 of these AOG wells in their databases.
  - There were 17 major companies in Canada's oil and gas markets. This included Suncor Energy, Calgary-headquartered Imperial Oil, Canadian Natural Resources, Cenovus Energy, Husky Energy—a subsidiary of Cenovus since January 2021, TC Energy, Chevron Canada, a subsidiary of San Ramon, California-based Chevron Corporation, Hong Kong-headquartered CNOOC International, the Spanish company Repsol Canadian subsidiary, Repsol Oil & Gas Canada, Shell Canada, a subsidiary of Anglo-Dutch Royal Dutch Shell, MEG Energy, a junior, Athabasca Oil Corporation—a Calgary-based Canadian company which is in partnership with PetroChina, ConocoPhillips Canada—a subsidiary of Texas-based ConocoPhillips, and Syncrude Canada—a joint venture of five partners Suncor Energy, Imperial Oil, Sinopec, and CNOOC Limited, and Calgary-headquartered-Enbridge— a multinational energy transportation company and Pembina Pipeline. Since at least 2010, Athabasca Oil Sands Corporation, Canadian Natural Resources, Cenovus Energy, Dover Operating Corporation, Esso Imperial Oil, Husky Energy, Suncor Energy, Syncrude, and Total funded research into environmental concerns, including groundwater.
  - An Alberta Liabilities Disclosure Project report that accessed AER data through data under freedom of Information, estimated that Alberta had 300,000 unreclaimed wells. One of the report's authors, Regan Boychuk, said that—without including unreclaimed pipelines and pumping stations—the estimated cost of unreclaimed wells alone, is approximately $40 billion to $70 billion.
  - Between 2005 and 2021, Canada experienced a rise in overall emissions from 32% to 38%. During the same period, Alberta observed a notable increase of 20.2 million tonnes in emissions, while all other provinces, except Manitoba, exhibited a decrease in emissions, according to The Tyee. Manitoba recorded an increase of 1 million tonnes during this timeframe. Under the policies related to methane emissions and coal-fired electricity, introduced during the premiership of Rachel Notley, there were some declines in emissions in Alberta.
- 2022
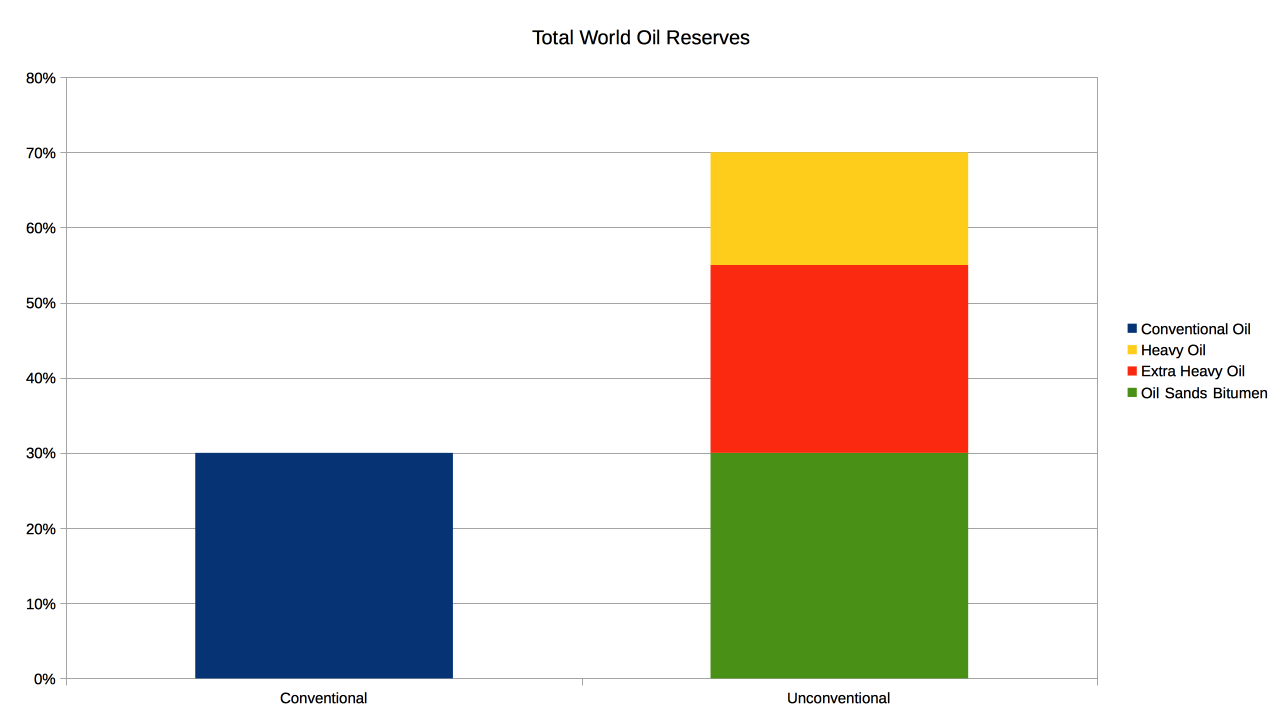
  While Alberta produces over 2.8 million barrels a day of unconventional oil; conventional oil production is less than 500,000 barrels per day. This chart shows percentages of global reserves.
  The oil and gas sector provided 22% of the Government of Alberta's total estimated revenue for the fiscal year 2021/22. Since 2012, the Alberta government has received $66 billion from the sector.
  - AER reported that, as of July 2022, there were about 170,000 abandoned wells in the province that are the responsibility of the licensees for all abandonment and reclamation costs. This represents 37% of all the wells in Alberta.
  - According to a 2022 article in BOE Report—"Canada’s source for oil and gas news, activity and information" since its establishment in 2013—by 2032, there will be an estimated 258,000 wells designated to be abandoned in Alberta alone.
  - By 2022, of all the wells in Alberta, only 35% were active, according to the January 2022 PB0 report on the cost of cleaning Canada's orphan oil and gas wells.
  - The January 2022 Parliamentary Budget Officer (PB0) report on the cost of cleaning Canada's orphan oil and gas wells, estimated that it would cost $361 million just to clean traditional orphan wells nationally, which does not include the cost of oil sands operations. By 2025, the forecast is $1.1 billion in clean up costs for orphan wells.
  - According to AER, as of December 2022, of the 463,000 oil and gas wells in Alberta, 33.7% or 156,031 were active and 28% or 129,640 were reclaimed. There were 172,236 wells that were either abandoned or inactive—19% or 88,433 were abandoned and 18.1% or 83,803 were inactive.
  - With the Russian invasion of Ukraine, the period between April 2020, with its low prices of oil, to the highs in March 2022, represented the "largest 23-month increase in energy prices since the 1973 oil price".
  - The price of Brent crude oil averaged $116/bbl, representing an increase of 55% in March 2022 compared with December 2021.
  - March 4 The price of Western Canadian Select (WCS) soared to over $100 US per barrel.
- 2023 According to the February 1, 2023 OWA Orphan Inventory, there were 3,114 orphan sites designated by AER that required decommissioning. This number also includes orphaned pipelines and orphan facilities, including the Mazeppa Gas Plant pumping station.
  - The OWA's 2023 Inventory lists only 3,114 orphan well sites. These are sites that have been designated by AER and assigned to the OWA because they require decommissioning.
  - There are thousands of oil and gas well in municipalities and on landowners properties that require plugging or reclamation and have no solvent owner, but have not yet transitioned to orphan status. They represent environmental and public safety liabilities but are not designated as orphaned by AER and are not being addressed. Liabilities and taxes for these wells become the responsibility of municipalities and landowners depending on where the wells are located. The 2023 OWA Inventory included only 3,114 orphan sites for which it was responsible.
  - According to RMA president, Paul McLauchlin, by 2023, the oil and gas industry owed $245 million in unpaid property taxes to towns and villages across Alberta.
  - March 23 Alberta auditor general, Doug Wylie, published another report critical of the United Conservative Party's (UCP) neglect of orphan wells and other oil patch liabilities in the province. The report said that even though the number of inactive wells increased every year since 2000—except for the year that the federal government provided $1.2 billion dollars—operators still have no timelines for site remediation. Two major issues have not been dealt with—"so-called 'legacy sites' and "inadequate security collected". Current AER liability management processes to mitigate risks "associated with closure of oil and gas infrastructure" are not "well-designed" and are not effective.
