= Orphan wells in Alberta, Canada =

Inactive oil or gas sites in Alberta with no solvent owner

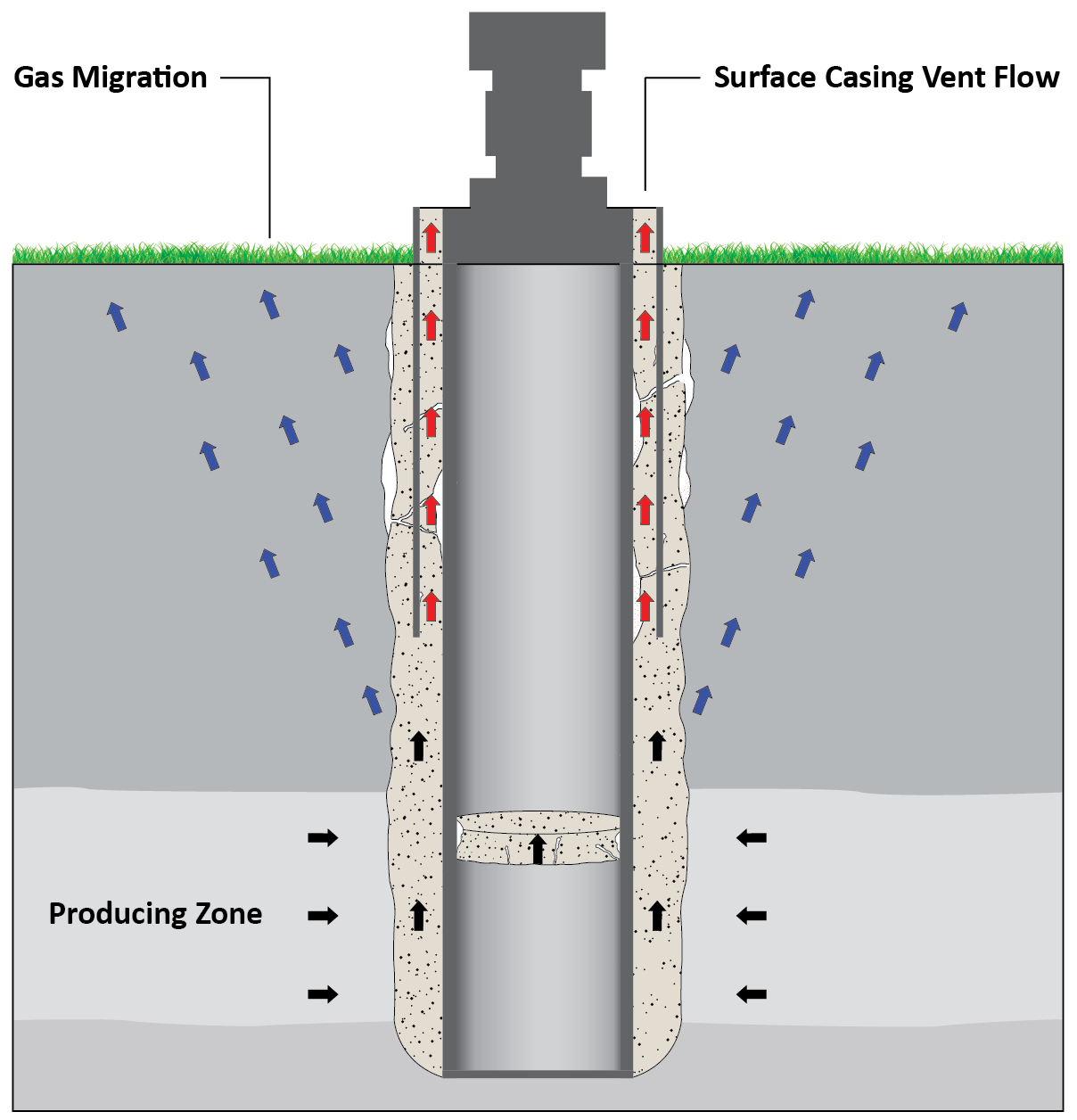
Fugitive gas emissions are leaking from this "abandoned" (Note: The oil and gas industry uses the term "abandoned" to refer to plugged wells, which has led to "countless confusing headlines.") plugged well, which may be licensed to an operator and suspended, or simply orphaned.

Orphan wells in Alberta, Canada are inactive oil or gas well sites that have no solvent owner who can be held legally or financially accountable for the decommissioning and reclamation obligations to ensure public safety and to address environmental liabilities.

The 100% industry-funded Alberta Energy Regulator (AER)—the sole regulator of the province's energy sector—manages licensing and enforcement related to the full lifecycle of oil and gas wells based on Alberta Environment Ministry requirements, including orphaned and abandoned wells. Oil and gas licensees are liable for the responsible and safe closure and clean-up of their oil and gas well sites under the Polluter Pays Principle (PPP) as a legal asset retirement obligation (ARO). An operator's liability for surface reclamation issues continues for 25 years following the issuance of a site reclamation certificate. There is also a lifelong liability in case of contamination.

Once the current environmental legislation was in place, and the industry-led and industry-funded Orphan Wells Association (OWA), was established in 2002, some orphan wells became the OWA's responsibility. OWA's Inventory does not include legacy wells which are more complex, time-intensive and costly to remediate. Following the 2014 downturn in the global price of oil, there was a "tsunami" of orphaned wells, facilities, and pipelines resulting from bankruptcies.

As of March 2023, oil and gas companies owe rural municipalities $268 million in unpaid taxes; they owe landowners "tens of millions in unpaid lease payments". Original owners of what are now orphan wells "failed to fulfill their responsibility for costly end-of-life decommissioning and restoration work"; some sold these wells "strategically to insolvent operators". Landowners suffer both "environmental and economic consequences" of having these wells on their property. OWA funding is underfunded by at least several hundred million. The total estimate for cleaning up all existing sites is as much as $260 billion. Remediation is paid for through federal and provincial bailouts, a PPP violation.

== Current overview ==
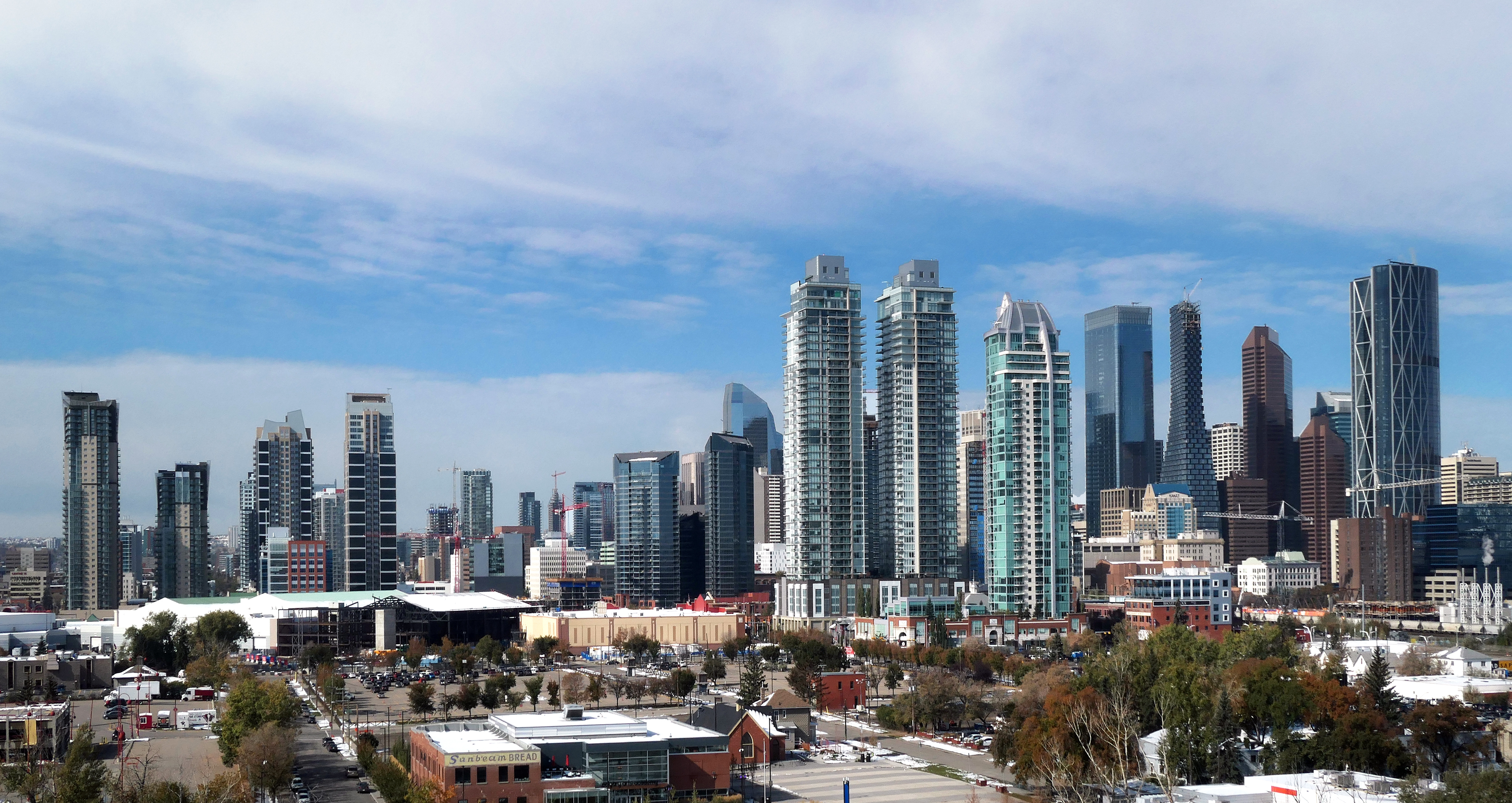
Many of the skyscrapers in downtown Calgary are head offices for Alberta's oil and gas sector, to which the city and the province owe their rapid growth and status as the centre of Canada's oil industry. Alberta provides 80% of Canada's oil.

In 2017, of the estimated 450,000 AER oil and gas registered wells (Note: Hardie and Lewis reported that as of 2015, there were 600,000 wells drilled in Alberta, Saskatchewan, and Manitoba based on a AER presentation at a meeting of Oklahoma's Interstate Oil and Gas Compact Commission meeting on SCVF and GM.) in the province, 150,000 were no longer producing but were not remediated, and 92,000 were inactive with no set value. A 2021 Alberta Liabilities Disclosure Project report, "The Big Clean", that accessed AER data through a Freedom of Information (FOIP) request, estimated that Alberta had 300,000 unreclaimed wells and that it would cost from $40 to $70 billion to clean them up. This cost estimate does not include unreclaimed pipelines and pumping stations. The ALDP, an independent, nonpartisan research organization that provides "government-level data" on liabilities related to the oil and gas industry in Alberta, seeks solutions to—what they describe as—a "growing liabilities crisis".

Unreclaimed wells are inactive wells that may be orphaned or legally-licensed. Some unreclaimed wells may have been sealed off, while some have begun or completed remediation or reclamation of the well site. Under current AER regulations, it is legal for operators to leave well reclamation suspended indefinitely, this is not the case in some oil producing states, such as North Dakota. Daryl Bennett, who represents landowners through both My Landman Group and Action Surface Rights "in disputes involving resource companies", said that there were 170,000 unreclaimed sites that require cleaning. These unreclaimed wells were licensed by the province to oil and gas operators under Alberta's mineral rights provision, by which landowners only have surface—not below the surface mineral rights—and have no right of refusal to prevent a well being drilled on their property. When the wells were producing, landowners benefitted, as operators pay an annual fee to lease and access the site. When operators go bankrupt or simply cannot be relocated, landowners are left with these aging wells with no recourse. By 2001, there were about 59,000 farms with at least one well on their property. By 2023, wells and pumpjacks dot the landscape across much of rural Alberta with a well for almost every 1.4 km^{2} (0.54 sq mi).

In 2019, the Intergovernmental Panel on Climate Change (IPCC) warned that methane gas leakage from abandoned oil and gas wells represented a serious risk to climate change and recommended the monitoring of these wells. Canada began to monitor methane leakage from abandoned wells at that time.

It is uncertain how many of the roughly 300,000 inactive wells belong to the various classifications that describe oil and gas wells in Alberta. The oil and gas industry refer to wells that have been sealed as "abandoned", or to be exact, "responsibly abandoned". The Narwhal says that this has led to "countless confusing headlines." There are numerous inactive well sites that are neither sealed nor officially designated as orphans by AER. The annual inventory of the OWA does not include orphaned wells that AER has identified but not transitioned into orphan status. The OWA is also not responsible for wells that were orphaned prior to its establishment in 2002. These wells are the responsibility of the regulatory and ministerial bodies, the AER and the Department of Energy. A 2021 Office of the Auditor General (OAG) report said that the regulator and ministry failed to prioritize sites and rejected responsibility for funding and cleaning well sites "even when evidence showed otherwise."

The January 2022 Parliamentary Budget Office (PB0) report on the cost of cleaning Canada's orphan oil and gas wells said that, in spite of the 1.7 billion federal money provided during the pandemic, the cost of cleaning up orphan well sites nationally will require funding sources from industry, the provinces, and the federal government. By January 2022, Alberta had given about 50% of the allocated funding to viable energy companies, not companies "with an acute financial risk."

The CAPP says that most of their member companies pay taxes and clean up their own wells and that the bankruptcies—one of the prime factors in the increase in orphan wells. were the result of the "lagging effects of this multi-year downturn for the oil and gas sector." The increase in the number of insolvencies and wells with no solvent owner was the result of the "largest oil price declines in modern history" in 2014 to 2016 and the longest decline in oil prices since the 1980s.

As of 2022, most orphan wells were still not remediated. Farmers and ranchers suffer both "environmental and economic consequences" as the wells on their land, which are licensed as active, are not. They face decades-long challenges including land devaluation because of orphan wells, and contamination, and loss of compensation from bankrupt companies. Insolvent operators owe landowners "tens of millions" in unpaid surface rights lease payments, and/or transfer costs, such as taxes onto the landowners. These delinquent operators owe municipalities $268 million in unpaid taxes Rural Municipalities of Alberta (RMA) says this represents an increase of 261%, since 2018—despite industry recording multi-billions in profits. This will result in service cuts or tax increases at the municipal level. The level of unpaid taxes reported in was "unprecedented" and presented a "unique challenge that has not been experienced by municipalities in Alberta before."

Starting in March 2022, the industry experienced the "largest 23-month increase in energy prices since the 1973 oil price" following the Russian invasion of Ukraine. The increase in the price of oil resulting record profits for Canadian oil companies, with some of them earning billions. In Alberta, Canadian Natural Resources, Cenovus Energy, Paramount Resources and Whitecap Resources earned a combined net income approximately $5 billion in the fourth quarter alone of the fiscal year 2022.

The OWA funding is "grossly inadequate" by at least several hundred million. The total estimate for cleaning up all existing sites is as much as $260 billion. Taxpayers have paid the difference through federal and provincial bailouts in the form of grants and loans, a PPP violation.

Concerns have been raised about the "murky practice" of offloading liabilities strategically to smaller, junior operators with insufficient funds that are likely to face future insolvency. This practice allows original owners of what are now orphan wells to avoid paying for costly end-of-life decommissioning and restoration work for which they were responsible. Many of these wells become orphan wells. In this way, companies misuse the bankruptcy process to keep their valuable assets. The OWA says as owners shirk their responsibility the collective becomes responsible for the liabilities. Fifty percent of the delinquent wells are owned by small companies that have insufficient finances but are still able to produce and collect revenue. There is a direct correlation between these abandoned wells' environmental liabilities, unpaid taxes, and unpaid surface payments to landowners.

The AER has the authority to enforce the rules. The RMA says that the AER "props" up small companies to avoid increasing the already concerning number of orphan wells which results primarily from bankruptcies. The AER says that it is the RMA's role to collect taxes. A lawyer representing Action Surface Rights, a landowners group, Christine Laing, called on the AER to use the power it has more often and in a timely fashion to "protect the public interest".

The International Institute for Sustainable Development (IISD), which was established in 1990 during the premiership of Brian Mulroney as part of Canada's contribution to the 2002 Rio Earth Summit, drew attention to ways in which Canadian producers have failed on ESG issues.

== Context ==
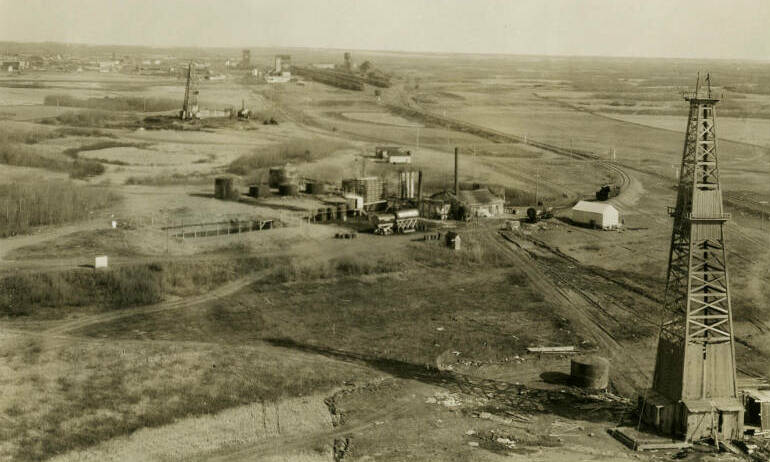
Alberta oil derricks, 1920s

The province's oldest inactive well has been dormant and unreclaimed since June 30, 1918.

Some of the legacy sites were in operation in the 1920s or earlier, and have no known operator and no "financial security to cover the cleanup costs."

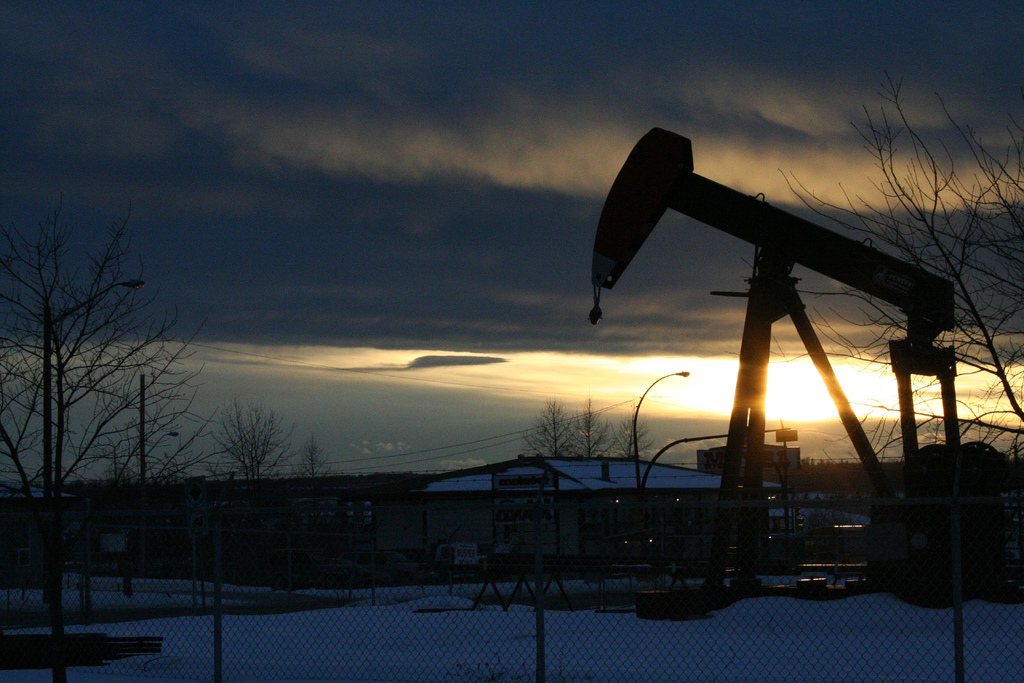
The small hamlet of Drayton Valley grew rapidly after Pembina oil was discovered in 1954, and became Alberta's first model oil town. This was the period when many wells were drilled; by 2017, there were approximately 400,000 in Alberta.

Canada's oil production in 1946 was only 21,000 barrels (3,300 m^{3}) of oil per day. By 1956, Alberta was producing 400,000 barrels (64,000 m^{3}) per day.

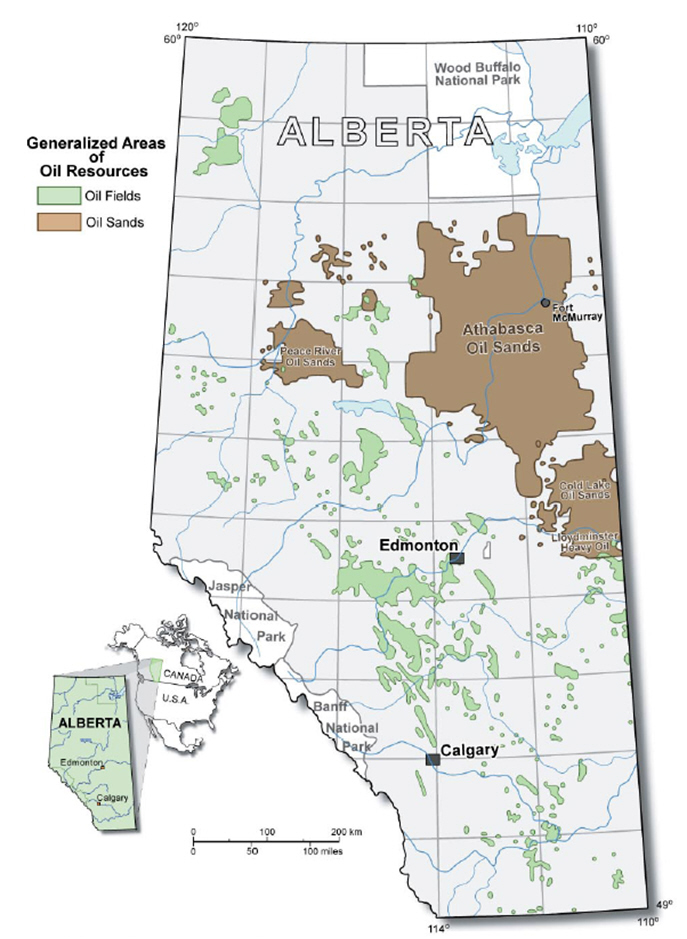
The area in green, as of 2010, shows only a fraction of the oil fields in Alberta, where 400,000 wells dot the entire province—drilled for conventional oil. By 2022, only 156,031 of these wells were active. The area in brown, the Athabasca oil sands, now produces most of the oil in Alberta, which is unconventional oil.

In 2012, the OWA only had 14 classified orphan wells; in 2013 there were 74; in 2014 there were 162; in 2015 there were 705; in 2024 there were 2,647.

The average cost of reclamation/remediation (R/R) site services in 2015 was $180,000 per site and range from $20,000 to $1 million. This provides work during downturns in the oil industry.

Prior to 2017, the energy industry paid $15 million a year into the Orphan Fund Levy. It doubled to $30 million in 2017.

Between 1955 and 2017, approximately 580,000 wells were drilled in Canada, according to a Natural Resources Canada (NRC) report on wellbore integrity in the oil and gas industry in Canada. Of these, 400,000 were in Alberta and the NRC anticipated that there would be 100,000s more drilled.

The New Democratic Party (NDP) provincial government began consulting with the energy industry in 2017 to "introduce new rules that might limit a multi-billion-dollar public liability for reclaiming about 80,000 inactive wells around Alberta."

The C.D. Howe Institute report estimated that the social cost of orphan wells, including those incurred by financially insolvent firms, could be more than $8.6 billion.

In 2017, the federal government provided Alberta with a one-time grant of $30 million for "decommissioning and reclamation" which the province used to "cover the interest on a $235 million repayable loan".

As of 2018, 37.8% of all inactive wells—89,217—had been inactive for up to 5 years; 29.8% had been inactive for 5 to 10 years; 16% from 10 to 15 years; 8.2% from 15 to 20 years; 3.9% from 20 to 25 years; and 4.5% had been inactive for over 25 years.

Based on the OWA's 2018 data, at the current level of the orphan well inventory, the cost of well abandonment and reclamation of their inventory of orphan wells was expected to be around $611 million. However, this estimate of $611 million does not include potential orphan wells. In this context, potential candidates include wells owned by financially insolvent firms and nearly insolvent firms.

The cost of abandonment and remediation per well can be estimated from reviewing the OWA's annual report; those costs are estimated to be $61,000 and $20,000 per well respectively.

Of the 440,000 wells drilled in the province, approximately 22,000 were leaking as of 2019.

As part of Alberta's Area-Based Closure program (ABC), which represented 70% of the provinces remediation activity, the oil and gas industry spent approximately $340 million on clean up.

The federal government provided a grant of $1.2 billion through the COVID-19 Economic Response Plan announced in 2020. Using the federal grant, in 2020, the province funded the Alberta Site Rehabilitation Program (ASRP) with $1 million in provincial loans. The oil and gas industry paid almost the same amount on clean up—$363—as they did in 2019, in spite of the federal grant.

As of 2020, there were about 97,000 inactive wells that were not properly closed and another 71,000 abandoned wells requiring clean-up, according to a University of Calgary Policy School article.

The January 2022 Parliamentary Budget Officer (PB0) report on the cost of cleaning Canada's orphan oil and gas wells, estimated that it would cost $361 million just to clean traditional orphan wells nationally, which does not include the cost of oil sands operations.

More than 50% of Alberta's wells are not producing oil or gas, yet they have not been cleaned up.

The OWA spent $161.5 million in the fiscal year 2021/2022 on decommissioning wells, pipelines, and facilities. In 2021/22 42% of this total went going towards well decommissioning, 30% towards site reclamation, 13% to facilities decommissioning, and 5% to pipeline decommissioning.

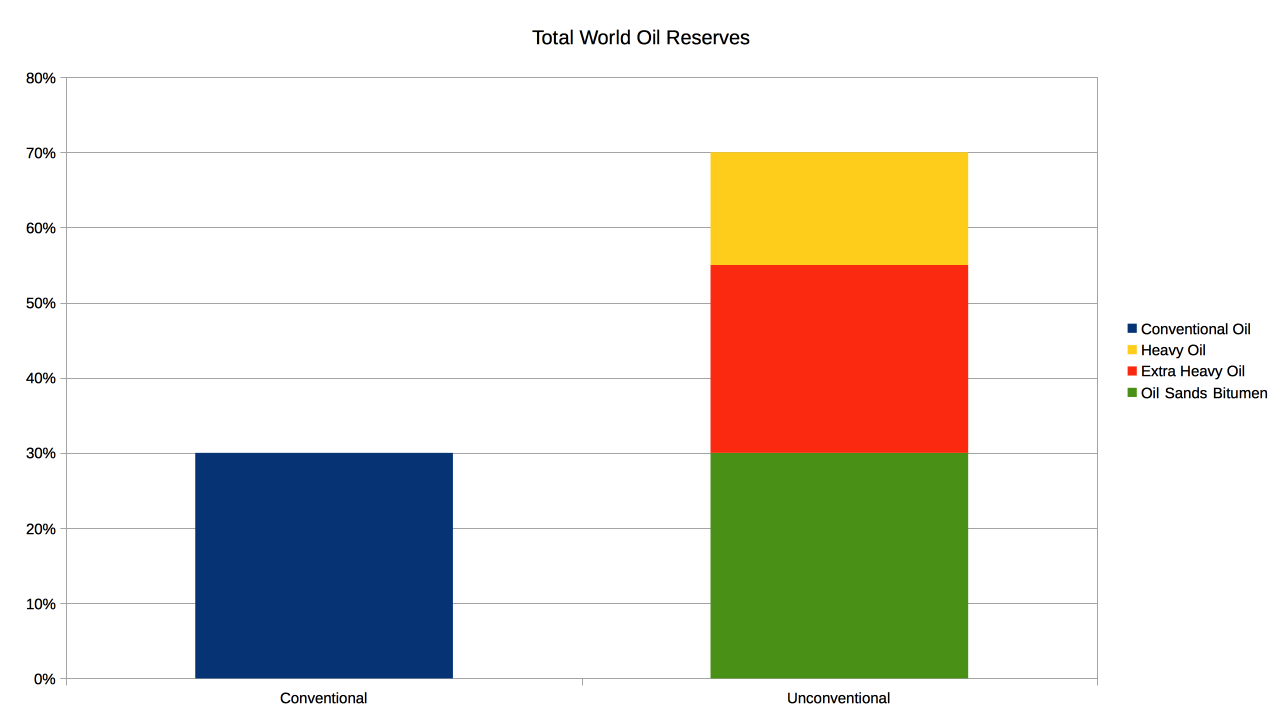
While Alberta produces over 2.8 million barrels a day of unconventional oil; conventional oil production is less than 500,000 barrels per day. This chart shows percentages of global reserves.

The oil and gas sector provided 22% of the Government of Alberta's total estimated revenue for the fiscal year 2021/22. Since 2012, the Alberta government has received $66 billion from the sector.

AER reported that, as of July 2022, there were about 170,000 abandoned wells in the province that are the responsibility of the licensees for all abandonment and reclamation costs. This represents 37% of all the wells in Alberta.

The January 2022 Parliamentary Budget Officer (PB0) report on the cost of cleaning Canada's orphan oil and gas wells, estimated that it would cost $361 million just to clean traditional orphan wells nationally, which does not include the cost of oil sands operations. By 2025, the forecast is $1.1 billion in clean up costs for orphan wells.

According to AER, as of December 2022, of the 463,000 oil and gas wells in Alberta, 33.7% or 156,031 were active and 28% or 129,640 were reclaimed. There were 172,236 wells that were either abandoned or inactive—19% or 88,433 were abandoned and 18.1% or 83,803 were inactive.

There are thousands of oil and gas well in municipalities and on landowners properties that require plugging or reclamation and have no solvent owner, but have not yet transitioned to orphan status. They represent environmental and public safety liabilities but are not designated as orphaned by AER and are not being addressed. Liabilities and taxes for these wells become the responsibility of municipalities and landowners depending on where the wells are located. The 2023 OWA Inventory included only 3,114 orphan sites for which it was responsible.

== Landowners and municipalities ==
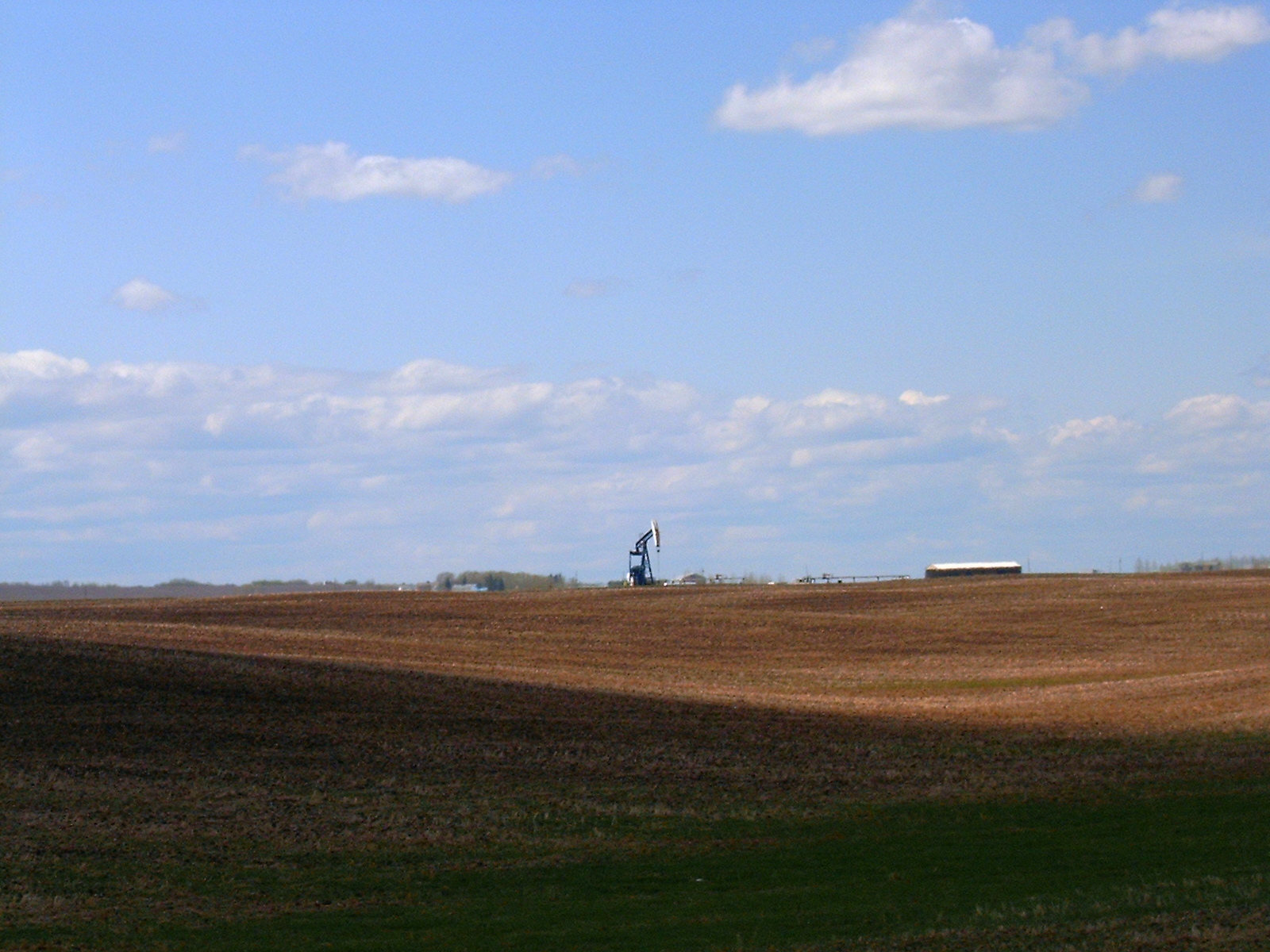
A well in rural Alberta in 2005

In contrast to Texas, where private property owners own both the mineral and surface rights, in Alberta, landowners only own surface rights, and they do not have the right of refusal to prevent extraction companies from operating wells on their private property. Many of the orphan wells are on private property owned by ranchers, farmers, and others. By 2001, there were about 59,000 farm or ranch properties in the province that had at least one well on their property. While the AER and CAPP were pleased with the 2019 Supreme Court ruling on orphan wells, landowners with orphan wells left by defunct energy companies, are concerned about the impact of the orphan wells on "crops, water and the environment".

Bennett's group was invited by Alberta Energy Minister Peter Guthrie to a February 9, 2023 meeting on Premier's Smith proposed Liability Management Incentive Program. While Bennett acknowledged that it was "somewhat regrettable" that taxpayers would fund the LMIP, and oil companies would see their royalties reduced.

Based on a survey in early January 2019, the Rural Municipalities of Alberta's (RMA) reported an "unprecedented" unpaid $81 million in property taxes from oil and gas companies that presented a "unique challenge that has not been experienced by municipalities in Alberta before." According to RMA president, Paul McLauchlin, by 2023, the oil and gas industry owed $268 million in unpaid property taxes to towns and villages across Alberta. In response to their concerns in 2021, Dale Nally, then Associate Minister of Natural Gas, said that the solution to unpaid taxes lies in the province helping the "battered" oil and gas industry so they can "pay their municipal taxes and contribute to the economy."

== Orphan Well Association ==
The oil-industry led Orphan Well Association (OWA) is an independent, non-profit organization, that was established in 2002 with a mandate to protect public safety and to manage the "environmental risks of oil and gas properties that do not have a legally or financially responsible party that can be held to account." The OWA is responsible for orphan wells, pipelines, and facilities.

Representatives from the Alberta provincial government, the AER and Alberta Environment and Parks (AEP), Canadian Association of Petroleum Producers (CAPP), and the Explorers and Producers Association of Canada (EPAC) serve on the OWA's board of directors. Brad Herald is the Chair of the OWA and is also CAPP vice-president.

The OWA manages the potential environmental and public safety risks that these orphaned properties represent. It also maintains an inventory, and oversees the decommissioning, remediation, and reclamation of these sites. The OWA's mandate includes the management of the "decommissioning (abandonment) of upstream oil and gas 'orphan' wells, pipelines, facilities and the remediation and reclamation of their associated sites."

The OWA is also responsible for orphaned pipelines and orphan facilities, which now includes the newly established Large Facility Liability Management Program (LFP). The LFP operates with separate financing from orphan wells and has its own levy set at $3 million a year. By 2022, its first project—decommissioning the Mazeppa Gas Plant pumping station facilities south of Calgary—was almost completed. Critics say that the annual Orphan Wells Levy decided by the industry and set by AER is too low to cover the actual size of the problem.

== OWA funding ==
Because orphan wells are the entire responsibility of the oil and gas industry, they are also responsible for funding OWA's operations. Industry funding for the OWA includes an annual Orphan Wells Levy prescribed by the AER, in consultation with the Canadian Association of Petroleum Producers (CAPP) and Explorers and Producers Association of Canada (EPAC). CAPP's members produce about 80% of oil and gas in Canada. The levy is based on the "estimated cost of decommissioning and reclamation activities for the upcoming fiscal year". Prior to 2017, the energy industry paid $15 million a year into the fund. It doubled to $30 million in 2017. For the fiscal year 2021/2022 it was set at $65 million. Critics say that this levy is inadequate to cover the costs of the orphan wells clean up.

As of 2022, the annual Orphan Fund Levy on oil and gas companies set by the industry-funded Alberta Energy Regulator (AER) is very low in relation to the OWA's responsibilities. The OWA Levy is prescribed by the AER, in consultation with the Canadian Association of Petroleum Producers (CAPP) and Explorers and Producers Association of Canada (EPAC)—based on the "estimated cost of decommissioning and reclamation activities for the upcoming fiscal year". The 2021 levy was $65 million.

OWA funding comes from a levy paid by the Alberta energy industry and collected by the AER.

The OWA Inventory only includes orphan wells that have been designated as orphaned by the AER.

=== Federal and provincial subsidies ===
Although the OWA is meant to be funded entirely by the oil and gas industry, it is also subsidized by the federal and provincial governments through grants and loans.

The ballooning costs of decommissioning and reclamation were transferred from the oil and gas industry to the public which many see as corporate welfare and a PPP violation.

Federal grants include $30 million in 2017 and 1.2 billion dollars in 2020.

In 2017, the Government of Canada provided Alberta with a one-time grant of $30 million for "activities associated with decommissioning and reclamation". In that year, the provincial government used the federal funds to "cover the interest on a $235 million repayable loan" which the oil and gas industry will repay over the next nine years, to support the OWA's efforts.

As part of the federal government's COVID-19 Economic Response Plan, in April 2020, new financial aid was announced to help sustain employment in the energy sector that also served to respond to environmental concerns in provinces with orphan and inactive oil and gas wells. Of the total $1.72 billion, up to $1.2 billion was available to the Alberta government and $200 million was made available in the form of a loan to the Orphan Wells Association. By January 2022, Alberta had given about 50% of the allocated funding to viable energy companies, not companies "with an acute financial risk."

In 2020, Alberta established the Alberta Site Rehabilitation Program (ASRP) through which applicants could apply for grants of up to $30,000. The province also loaned the OWA $100-million for 1,000 environmental site assessments, as part of the process of decommissioning 800 to 1,000 orphan wells. The loan was intended to "create 500 direct and indirect jobs in the oil services sector." The loan was intended to enable the OWA to double its activity in 2020 to nearly 2,000 wells.

In early February 2023, the Premier of Alberta introduced a controversial $100 million Royalty Credit System as part of a new Liability Management Incentive Program (LMIP). If fully enacted, it would provide individual oil and gas companies with royalty credits for cleaning their own well sites that have been inactive for two decades or more. Alberta economist, Andrew Leach, said advocates for the oil industry were the original authors of the generous incentives-based royalty credit program, then called R-Star. According to a Scotiabank report, the incentive program "goes against the core capitalist principle that private companies should take full responsibility for the liabilities they willingly accept." Their analysts cautioned that the program could result in the public viewing the oil and gas sector negatively. The Scotiabank report said that "Canadian Natural Resources, Cenovus Energy, Paramount Resources and Whitecap Resources" would benefit most from the incentive program—their combined net income in fiscal year 2022 Q4 was almost $5 billion.Mount Royal University professor, Duane Bratt, said that there was an element of "corporate welfare" in the program, but there was also the "corruption element"—in 2022, Smith—as paid lobbyist for dozens of Calgary companies in the Alberta Enterprise Group—had promoted "$20 billion of R-Star credits" to then-energy minister Sonya Savage. The piloting of RStar was in Minister Guthrie's mandate letter. Critics include "[e]nvironmentalists, economists, landowners and analysts within Alberta Energy." Some also question how this could apply to orphan wells as, by definition, there is no legal party to be incentivized. In a February 22 statement, Premier Smith said that Minister Guthrie's consultation process would take a number of months to complete.

Calgary-based Canadian Natural Resources is one of OWA's "largest single funders." Canadian Natural, which "produces more than one million barrels of oil and gas per day, is also one of the most active at cleaning up." Of the 1,293 wells abandoned in 2018, the company "submitted 1,012 reclamation certificates."

== Alberta Energy Regulator ==
In Alberta, the sole regulator of the province's energy development—from a project's first application, licensing and production, through to its decommissioning, closure, and reclamation—is the 100% industry-funded corporation, the Alberta Energy Regulator (AER). The AER, which replaced the Energy Resources Conservation Board (ERCB) in 2013—following the passing of the Responsible Energy Development Act—operates at arm's length from the provincial government. AER regulations based on PPP, require energy companies to safely retire their inactive wells following provincial guidelines as a legal asset retirement obligation (ARO). This includes the proper plugging of inactive wells as well as performing remediation to return the site to the condition it was in prior to extraction operations.

AER wellbore licensing status includes abandoned, amended; cancelled; issued, re-entered, rec-certified; recexempt, rescinded; and suspension.

Industry funding for the OWA includes an annual Orphan Wells Levy prescribed by the AER, in consultation with the Canadian Association of Petroleum Producers (CAPP) and Explorers and Producers Association of Canada (EPAC). It is based on the "estimated cost of decommissioning and reclamation activities for the upcoming fiscal year".

In March 2014, AER took over Alberta Environment and Sustainable Resource Development's (ESRD) responsibilities to regulate reclamation and remediation activities resulting from fossil fuel extraction operations in Alberta. AER's Directive 079 provides guidelines and regulations regarding surface development in municipalities that have abandoned wells. This includes identification of wells through the Subdivision and Development Regulation (SDR) and requirements to identify abandoned wells located near developments. Directive 079 also requires oil and gas companies to locate and test wells.

On February 6, 2017, the Alberta Energy Regulator and the Alberta government revised Directive 67, which sets the "eligibility requirements for obtaining or continuing to hold a licence for energy development" in Alberta. The new requirements came in to place in response to concerns about the "growing number of licensees abandoning wells in an unprofitable market in bankruptcy proceedings." The changes gave AER the authority to refuse or grant licenses based on past behaviour, for example licensees with a "history, or a higher risk, of non-compliance". Previously, energy companies could get a license by paying a small down payment as long as they had an address, and some insurance. Revised compliance rules cover operational, pipeline, and emission issues.

The 2021 report submitted by Alberta's Office of the Auditor General (OAG), Doug Wylie, examined the provincial government's environmental liabilities and the roles of the Alberta Energy Regulator (AER) and Environment and Parks, now called Ministry of Environment and Protected Areas. Not all orphan and legacy wells are managed by the OWA. The regulator and the ministry also manage legacy and orphan wells that existed prior to the enactment of environmental legislation in 2000. The AER and the ministry—both under the jurisdiction of the government of Alberta—interpret their responsibilities differently. Each says the other has the responsibility to pay for and clean up oil and gas sites liabilities. This resulted in neither the regulatory nor the ministry taking "responsibility "for sites, even when evidence showed otherwise." There was a lack of information on funding sources for cleaning up sites as well as a lack of up-to-date cost estimates, and site prioritization. While regulatory AER staff maintained a list of legacy and orphan sites under its management, the list was not shared with AER's own financial staff until the list was uncovered through the OAG's audit. The list also included cost estimates with other similar sites.

Keith Wilson, who has been working with landowners on orphan wells for three decades, told The Narwhal in a 2018 interview that, "The [regulator's] system is not achieving anything. If anything, it's creating a false sense of comfort that this problem is being addressed—and we know it's not."

== Legal and regulatory considerations ==
Oil and gas companies that have profited from Alberta's energy revenue are liable for the responsible and safe closure and clean-up of their oil and gas well sites under the Polluter Pays Principle (PPP) as clearly defined by the Supreme Court of Canada (SCC) in 2003.

Alberta's Environmental Law Centre (ELC) said that while the polluter pays principle appears to be simple and straightforward, its evolution, operationalization, and application in Alberta is complex, as it is often politically charged.

As of, 2014, the EPEA "requires operators to conserve and reclaim specified land and get a reclamation certificate".

=== Polluter pays principle ===
The 1999 Canadian Environmental Protection Act, provided new powers for health and environmental protection. The Environmental Protection and Enhancement Act (EPEA) enacted in 2000, is the only statute in Alberta that references the polluter pays principle directly. The PPP is integrated in a variety of EPEA provisions but it does not have "an express statutory commitment to the principle."

In their 2003 decision in Imperial Oil v Quebec, the SCC described the Polluter Pays Principle, saying that, in order to "encourage sustainable development, that principle assigns polluters the responsibility for remedying contamination for which they are responsible and imposes on them the direct and immediate costs of pollution."

=== Suspended inactive wells ===
As of 2020, there were 97,920 wells that were "licensed as temporarily suspended" in Alberta. They were labelled as "zombie wells" by the New York Times. Owners of inactive wells can choose to suspend operations indeterminately, without going through the costly process of decommissioning, remediation and reclamation. Many suspended wells are orphaned, or simply deserted. They may still have oil, but are rarely recertified. They are mainly on private property whose landowners have limited recourse for having them removed, maintaining the site, or collecting surface rights access fees. Suspended wells have the highest risk of methane gas leaks, which increases with the age of the well. Of all the inactive wells in Alberta, 29% —27,532 wells—have been suspended for more than a decade without being either "abandoned" or reactivated, as of March 25, 2021. There is no limit on the amount of time an inactive well can remain suspended under existing AER regulations, even though the danger of leakage increases with the age of the well. The lack of a time limit favours well owners who can avoid paying $75,000 to $100,000 to reclaim a wellsite, by paying only several thousand a year in surface rights access and municipal taxes. It is a liability for the ranchers on whose lands the wells are left. These suspended, inactive, "zombie" wells have become a "hazardous threat to public safety."

As of 2016, North Dakota—which shares a border with Alberta and also has a large oil sector—as of 2016, the state had no unfunded orphan or inactive well liabilities. They learned the "hard lessons" following previous boom and bust cycles. Starting in 2001, as the number of orphan wells began to increase, the state enacted a use-it-or-lose-it policy. Operators are required to either pump oil or plug their wells. After a year of nonproduction, the state's industrial commission "calls the company's bond, levies fines and plugs the well itself."

In contrast, in Alberta, owners of inactive wells can choose to suspend operations indeterminately, without going through the costly process of decommissioning, remediation and reclamation. AER has set no time limit requirement on suspended wells. A suspended well is only closed temporarily and may be reactivated. These wells may also be relicensed by AER as "re-entered" if a new owner takes over the site. The risk of leakage is higher in a suspended inactive well than in a well that the AER calls, "responsibly abandoned"—"rendered permanently incapable of flow and capped". Suspended inactive older wells present the highest risk of leakage. The risk of leakage in an inactive well increases with the amount of time it has been inactive without being properly closed down. Twenty-nine percent of all inactive wells in Alberta—27,532 wells—have been suspended for more than a decade without being either "abandoned" or reactivated, as of March 25, 2021. AER's Directive 020: Well Abandonment deals with suspended wells.

== Bankruptcies and orphan wells ==
Bankruptcies are prime factors in the increase in orphan wells. In the last decade, companies have become insolvent because of the "multi-year downturn for the oil and gas sector." This downturn or bust is part of the well-known cyclical nature of the oil and gas industry.

Historian David Finch, whose research focused on the oil industry in Western Canada, said that Alberta experienced three significant downturns in the oil industry since it first became commercially viable—the first in the 1960s; the second in the 1980s, and the third that started with the collapse of global oil prices in 2014. Crude oil prices dropped to near ten-year low prices. There were concerns that nearly a third of oil companies could go bankrupt. It was the longest oil price decline since the 1980s. That downturn resulted in what the CBC described in 2019 as a "tsunami" of orphaned oil and gas wells. By 2017, there were "3,127 wells that need[ed] to be plugged or abandoned, and a further 1,553 sites that have been abandoned but still need[ed] to be reclaimed".

Since the downturn in the oil industry in 2014, many companies became insolvent and went into receivership while holding costly liabilities, including abandoned wells.

The media brought attention to four cases where bankruptcies threatened to increase the inventory of orphan wells: Redwater Energy, Sequoia Resources, Trident Exploration, and Lexin Resources. Trident Exploration's receivership in May 2019 resulted in 3,650 wells that no longer had a solvent owners, and the loss of 94 jobs. Houston Oil & Gas entered receivership In November 2019, leaving behind 1,264 wells, 41 facilities and 251 pipelines.

When Redwater entered receivership in 2015, ATB Financial—a provincial Crown corporation and financial service that lends money to oil and gas companies, including Redwater—went to court to recover its investments through Redwater's assets. Redwater's bankruptcy trustee agreed that the banks and other creditors should collect first and any environmental liabilities, such as orphan wells, should get the leftovers. When two lower courts agreed with the trustee in 2016 and 2016, both the OWA and AER appealed their decisions before the Supreme Court of Canada. The SCC overturned the lower court decisions in Orphan Well Association v. Grant Thornton Ltd. (Redwater). This benchmark ruling led to changes in the way in which bankruptcies were handled when orphan wells were at stake. Prior to the 2019 SCC ruling, bankrupt energy companies were able to avoid paying for their abandoned wells. The SCC clarified that in the case of a bankruptcy, a company's first priority is to fulfil its environmental obligations—not as a debt—but as a duty to "citizens and communities."

=== Strategic packaging of costly liabilities with productive assets ===
An International Institute for Sustainable Development (IISD) report said that many of the orphan well sites were sold "strategically to insolvent operators". These owners avoid PPP responsibilities which included paying the hefty price of "end-of-life decommissioning and restoration work". Citing the case of the insolvent Bellatrix Exploration Ltd, which sold its unwanted wells to a numbered shell company—also under threat of insolvency—a 2021 Financial Post article also said that this "murky practice" of misusing the bankruptcy process to get rid of liabilities while keeping valuable assets is raising concerns. The OWA says as owners shirk their responsibility the collective becomes responsible for the liabilities.

Fifty percent of the delinquent wells are owned by small junior companies that have insufficient finances but are still able to produce and collect revenue. The RMA says that the AER "props" up small companies to avoid increasing the already concerning number of orphan wells which results primarily from bankruptcies. The AER says that it is the RMA's role to collect taxes. A lawyer representing Action Surface Rights, a landowners group, Christine Laing, called on the AER to use the power it has more often and in a timely fashion to "protect the public interest". Cases, such as Lexin and Sequoia, shed light on the complexity and opacity of ownership groups. It also drew attention to the way in which AER licensed, and ATB Financial provided loans, to small limited liability companies that had insufficient financing. This allowed them to take on risky legacy wells, then declare bankruptcy and avoid paying for clean up.

While Lexin is described in the media as a small Calgary-based limited liability company, its ownership group is MFC Resource Partnership of fifty-one companies—including Canadian Natural Resources Ltd., ExxonMobil Canada, and Husky Energy—who are also responsible for Levin's ARO. AER had begun to receive concerns submitted by Lexin's Mazeppa Gas Plant employees in early 2016. These were forwarded to Occupational Health and Safety. In February 2017, in response to concerns about public safety, environmental and financial risks, AER suspended Lexin's 1,600 or more licenses in a rare enforcement action—the largest suspension AER ever made. According to the Post, fifty-one companies, including Canadian Natural Resources Ltd., ExxonMobil Canada, and Husky Energy, who own some of Lexin Resources Ltd. assets, may share the responsibility for Lexin's AROs. Lexin had said that it would not be able to maintain its sour gas wells as of mid-February. The enforcement effectively placed Lexin in receivership with these wells and the Mazeppa Gas Plant being added to OWA's Inventory of orphan wells. AER sued Lexin to "recover money it is allegedly owed" saying that, "It is not open for a licensee, when times get tough, to transfer the burdens associated with holding AER licenses to the AER and/or the OWA." About 50% of the newly orphaned wells were the result of 2017 MFC/Lexin 1,400 wells OWA transfer.

Two years after purchasing 2,300 well licences in 2016 from Perpetual Energy Inc., Sequoia Resources entered receivership. Its liabilities including 4,000 wells, pipelines and other facilities". Then veteran AER CEO Jim Ellis, admitted in a public statement that the Sequoia "situation has exposed a gap in the system" that needed to be fixed. Sequoia's owners took Perpetual to court in an attempt to unwind the original 2016 sale—the first time such an attempt was made by a bankruptcy trustee in the province. Were it to succeed it would increase risks to oil and gas companies buying and selling assets.

In 2021, in response to the concerns filed by he OWA, CNRL, Sunoco, and dozens of landowners, in an "unusual step" AER called for a public hearing on Shell's application to transfer hundreds of its oil well licenses to a junior player with questionable. Landowners said that Shell was "shirking" its responsibilities by transferring dozens of wells to Pieridae, a small company that might not be able to cover the cost of cleaning up wells. In a 2020 BNN Bloomberg interview, a lawyer for landowners said that unlike CNRL and Sunoco, who take responsibility for their end-of-life wells, other major companies have been known to repackage liability wells with producing wells to sell to junior companies, with limited financial means. Premier Smith compared this to 2008 repackaged mortgages.

== Environmental impacts of orphan wells ==
Gas contamination from both active and orphaned wells, particularly hydrogen sulfide and methane, is increasingly attracting attention from Alberta government and the public. (Note: Jacobson said that the oil and gas industry was the source of about 50% of Canada's annual emissions of methane and that Alberta had set a goal of a 45% decrease in methane leakage from "active infrastructure by 2025".)

In addition to fugitive gas emissions, shallow aquifers can also be contaminated by gas, causing very serious issues. Groundwater contamination can be caused by casing leaks—such as integrity failures—of which orphaned wells are susceptible. However, because orphaned well-induced groundwater contamination is not reported annually, statistical data was not available as of 2018. In comparison, gas emissions are more easily monitored and tracked by operators. Despite the lack of groundwater contamination data, gas emission data collected by AER from oil and gas industry may potentially reflect areas of groundwater contamination.

=== Fugitive gas emissions ===
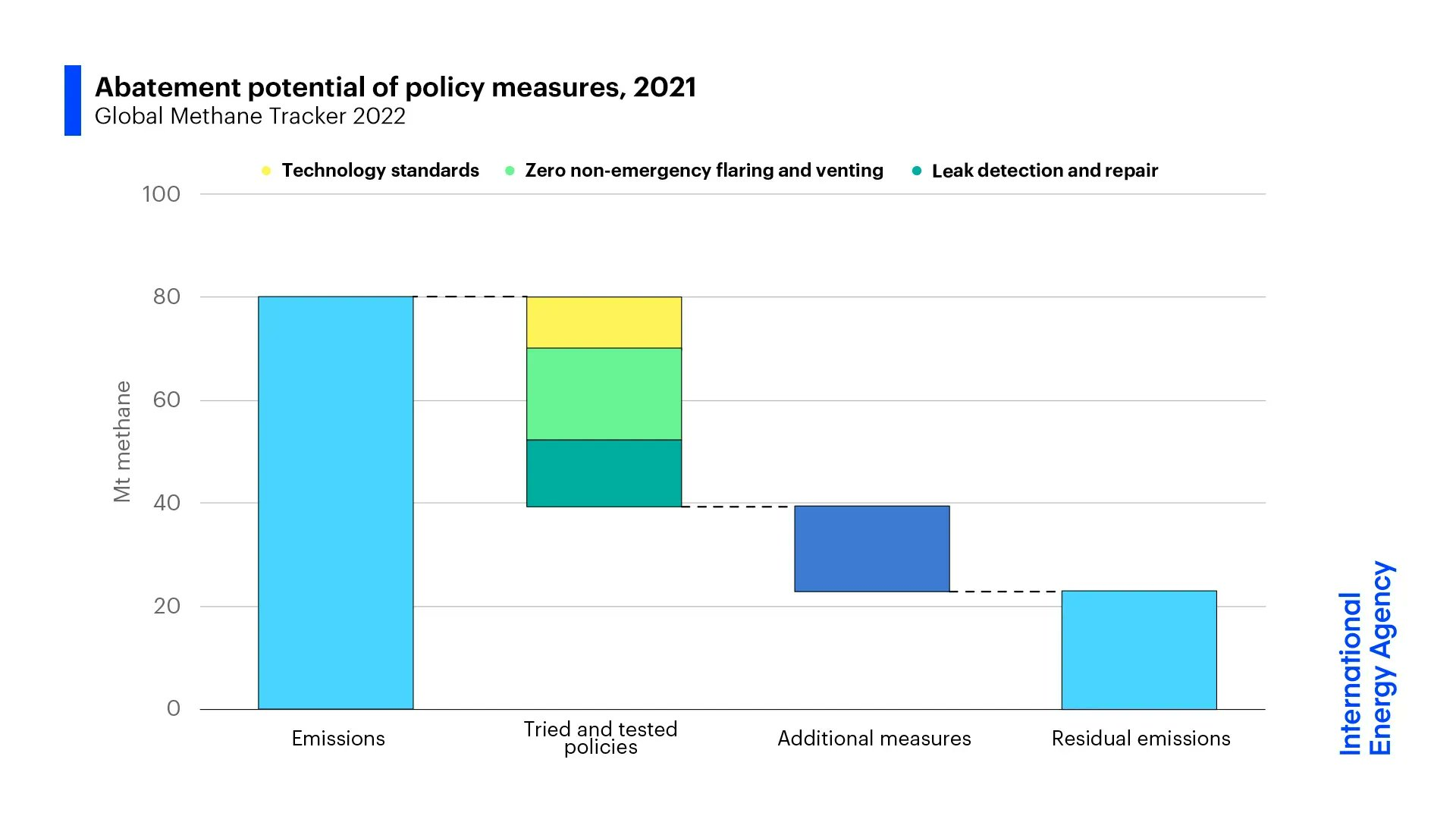
An International Energy Agency graphic showing the potential of various emission reduction policies for addressing global methane emissions

In the 1980s, Alberta's Energy Resources Conservation Board (ERCB)—the AER's precursor—warned of the dangers of fugitive gas emissions in 4,500 out of the 90,000 oil and gas wells in the province. The ERCB raised concerns of the increase in orphan wells in the 1980s and of the significant risks of GM in terms of contaminating usable groundwater.

Sources of methane emissions due to human activity (year 2020 estimates):
1. Fossil Fuel Use (33.0%)
2. Animal Agriculture (30.0%)
3. Plant Agriculture (18.0%)
4. Waste (15.0%)
5. All Other (4.00%)

The Energy Resources Conservation Board (ERCB) first identified surface casing vent flow (SCVF) and gas migration (GM) issues as a "significant concern" in the Lloydminster, Alberta area in the 1980s. The ERCB said that 5% of the approximately 90,000 wells or 4,500 wells in the province had SCVF and that 150 wells had GM. In the 1980s, GM concerns included an increase in the number of orphan wells and the "protection of useable groundwater."

In 2014, new regulation directed industry to "locate and test" any abandoned wells that were close to houses, airports, businesses, etc. that may pose a risk due to gas leakage. The resulting 33-page 2016 AER unpublished study showed that of the estimated 170,000 abandoned wells in Alberta, up to 3,400 posed a health risk. Of the 335 abandoned urban wells studied, there were 36 that were leaking and nine of these posed a risk to those who lived nearby. Most were in Medicine Hat, a city that now owns and operates 4,000 gas wells. The city's history is tied to the natural gas boom in the early 1900s which left many abandoned wells.

In 2019, Intergovernmental Panel on Climate Change (IPCC) scientists warned that methane gas leakage from abandoned oil and gas wells were a serious contributing factor in climate change. The IPCC recommended that United Nations member countries track and publish methane leakage from abandoned oil and gas wells as this represented a "global warming risk." By 2020, only Canada and the United States had begun to monitor methane leakage from abandoned wells. Over a period of two decades, in terms of global warming potential (GWP), methane has 80 times the "heat-trapping power" carbon dioxide (CO_{2}). According to the International Energy Agency (IEA)'s "Global Methane Tracker 2022", if all countries adopted well-known and effective methane reduction policy measures using existing technologies, it would decrease global methane emissions from the oil and gas sector by 50%.

=== Surface casing vent flow (SCVF) and gas migration (GM) ===
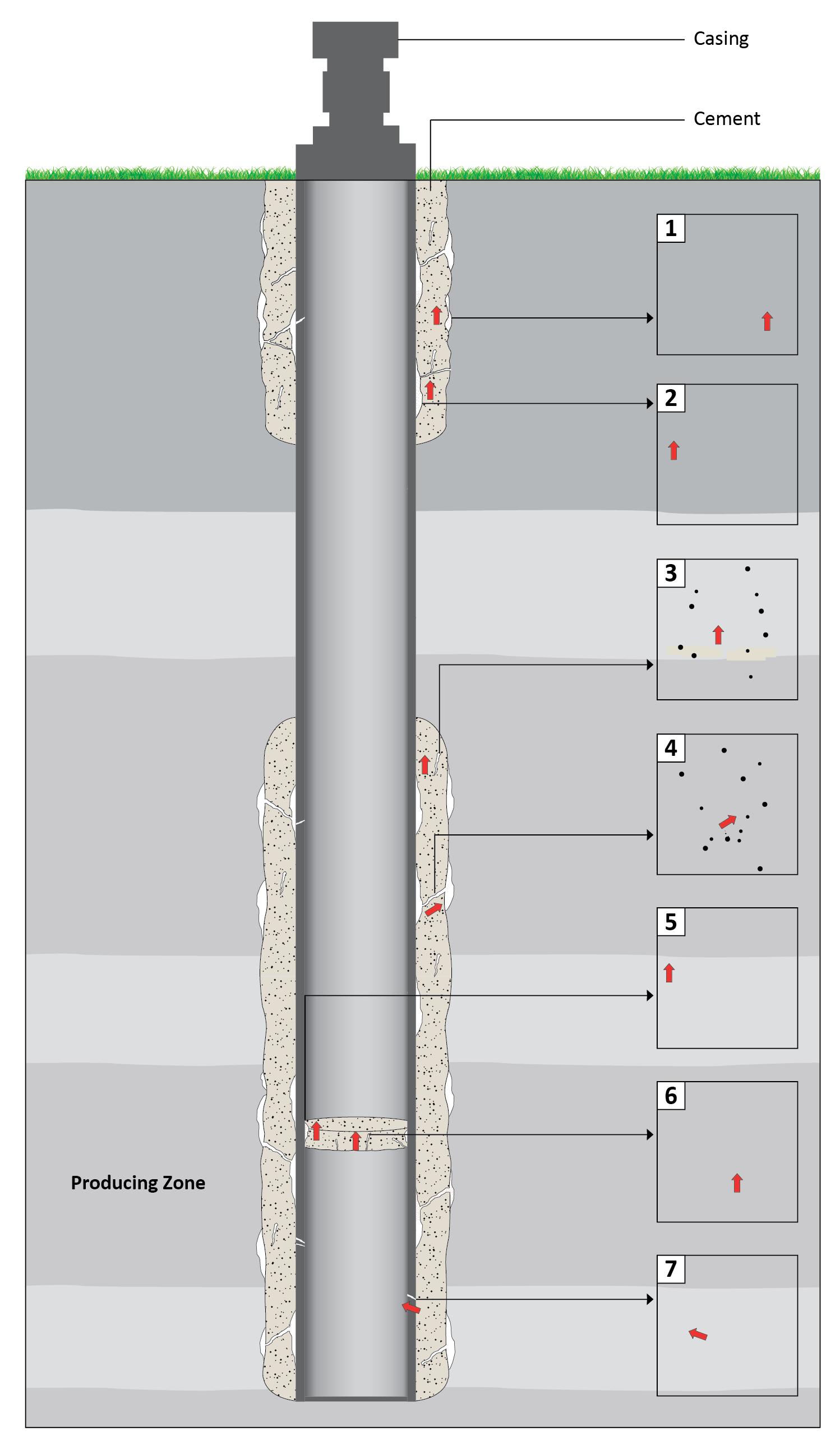
Causes of Fugitive gas emissions in orphaned and abandoned wells: 1. Cement/rock formation 2. Casing/encompassing cement 3. Casing/cement plug 4. Cement plug 5. Between casing/rock formation 6. between cavities 7. In the casing or well bore. Not all abandoned wells have been plugged like this one. Complete decommissioning includes removing the well head and reclaiming the site.

According to a 2015 conference presentation, the primary factors that should be considered in the evaluation of gas emissions from oil and gas wells are cementing, drilling orientation, geological conditions, well age, and reservoir depth. They reported on three types of wellbore leakage—8% of leaks were related to surface casing vent flow (SCVF) and gas migration (GM); 2% were the result of failures in the casing, and 2% were due to failures in the abandonment plugs.

SCVF and Gas Migration are two commonly recognized gas contamination mechanisms. SCVF is defined as the flow of gas and/or liquid along the surface casing/casing annulus. GM is defined as a flow of gas that is detectable at the outer surface of the outermost casing string usually occurring at very shallow reservoir layers. According to recent statistics from the Alberta Energy Regulator (AER), a total of 617 billion m^{3} of methane was released into atmosphere through venting (GM and SCVF) and flaring in Alberta during 2016, which has been constantly decreasing since 2012. Among the total emitted gas, 81 ⁣⁣⁣⁣million m^{3} originated from 9,972 unrepaired wells by GM and SCVF. Historically, there are 18,829 repaired and unrepaired wells reported with SCVF, GM, or both in Alberta, with 7.0% of them being inactive (9,530 wells suspended and orphaned). Wells with reported gas migration issues within Alberta are shown by Bachu in 2017.

Most of the thermal wells are orphaned oil or gas wells. A study from the International Journal of Greenhouse Gas Control concluded that gas migration mainly occurs within the central-northeastern part of the province, focusing around the Edmonton, Cold Lake, and Lloydminster areas. This observation is in agreement with the total gas flaring and venting conditions reported by the Alberta Energy Regulator (AER).

== Potential geothermal conversion of orphan wells in Alberta ==
After oil wells become depleted, their depth and size make them good candidates for extraction of geothermal energy. The prospect of geothermal conversion of depleted wells is attractive for several reasons including potential recovery of abandonment costs, reduced consumption of non-renewable energy, and elimination of geothermal drilling costs—a significant component in geothermal projects. Several studies propose the conversion of existing wells into double pipe heat exchangers through the installation of an insulated pipe inside the well for fluid circulation.

Across the province, a general northwestern trend of increasing geothermal gradient is commonly recognized with geothermal gradients ranging between 10 °C/km and 55 °C/km.

The controlling factors for this broad geothermal range in Alberta are poorly understood. Two main reasons have been proposed up to date to explain the observed patterns.

1. The flow of formation waters is the main controlling factor of the geothermal field, where low geothermal gradient areas coincide with water recharge areas (major upland areas) and high geothermal gradient with discharge areas (major lowland areas).
2. The differences in lithosphere thickness is responsible for the geothermal gradient distribution in Alberta since conduction is the main mechanism of transporting terrestrial heat from the basement to the surface.

The bottom hole temperatures (BHT) of wells within reasonable proximity to Albertan communities are, at best, sufficient for heating. Communities on the western side of Alberta are more likely to benefit from geothermal conversion for direct heat purposes. Previous projects in the United States have shown that temperatures around 80 °C are feasible for direct heating of institutions and district heating. Another study also reported the use of a low-temperature geothermal well in China for heating within its proximity.

There was a recent push by the US Department of Energy to investigate the feasibility of Deep Direct-Use (DDU) of low temperature geothermal resources.

== Responses ==
Critics blame the self-regulating nature of energy industry and its close relationship with provincial regulatory bodies for the lack of enforcement of existing regulations which allows oil and gas companies to avoid paying for the clean up. Others say it is a lack of political will to be more proactive in establishing public policies that would remediate the situation. Suggested solutions to the orphaned and abandoned well crisis, include ensuring that there is enough funding attached to each wellsite for its cleanup paid by those who profited from oil and gas revenue for decades, and enforcing a "use-it-or-lose-it policy as is the case in the neighbouring oil-producing state, North Dakota.

On March 23, 2023 Alberta auditor general, Doug Wylie, published another report critical of the United Conservative Party's (UCP) neglect of orphan wells and other oil patch liabilities in the province. The report said that even though the number of inactive wells increased every year since 2000—except for the year that the federal government provided $1.2 billion dollars—operators still have no timelines for site remediation. Two major issues have not been dealt with—"so-called 'legacy sites' and "inadequate security collected". Current AER liability management processes to mitigate risks "associated with closure of oil and gas infrastructure" are not "well-designed" and are not effective. Martin Olszynski, a University of Calgary resource law professor said the audit shows that this is more than mere "bureaucratic incompetence"; it reveals that the AER has been "captured" by the oil and gas industry. He said the UCP has refused "to do anything that might cost the industry money". Kathleen Ganley, the official opposition energy critic, said that the UCP has failed to protect taxpayers and is damaging the reputation of Alberta's energy industry's reputation.

== See also ==
- Orphaned and abandoned wells in the United States
- Selected timeline related to orphan wells in Alberta
