= Fugitive gas emissions =

Type of pollution from oil and natural gas drilling and coal mining

Fugitive gas emissions are emissions of gas (typically natural gas, which is primarily methane) to atmosphere or groundwater which result from oil and gas or coal mining activity. In 2016, these emissions, when converted to their equivalent impact of carbon dioxide, accounted for 5.8% of all global greenhouse gas emissions.

Most fugitive emissions are the result of loss of well integrity through poorly sealed well casings due to geochemically unstable cement. This allows gas to escape through the well itself (known as surface casing vent flow) or via lateral migration along adjacent geological formations (known as gas migration). Approximately 1-3% of methane leakage cases in unconventional oil and gas wells are caused by imperfect seals and deteriorating cement in wellbores. Some leaks are also the result of leaks in equipment, intentional pressure release practices, or accidental releases during normal transportation, storage, and distribution activities.

Emissions can be measured using either ground-based or airborne techniques. In Canada, the oil and gas industry is thought to be the largest source of greenhouse gas and methane emissions, and approximately 40% of Canada's emissions originate from Alberta. Emissions are largely self-reported by companies. The Alberta Energy Regulator keeps a database on wells releasing fugitive gas emissions in Alberta, and the British Columbia Oil and Gas Commission keeps a database of leaky wells in British Columbia. Testing wells at the time of drilling was not required in British Columbia until 2010, and since then 19% of new wells have reported leakage problems. This number may be a low estimate, as suggested by fieldwork completed by the David Suzuki Foundation. Some studies have shown a range of 6-30% of wells suffer gas leakage.

Canada and Alberta have plans for policies to reduce emissions, which may help combat climate change. Costs related to reducing emissions are very location-dependent and can vary widely. Methane has a greater global warming impact than carbon dioxide, as its radiative force is 120, 86 and 34 times that of carbon dioxide, when considering a 1, 20 and 100 year time frame (including Climate Carbon Feedback Additionally, it leads to increases in carbon dioxide concentration through its oxidation by water vapor.

== Sources of emissions ==
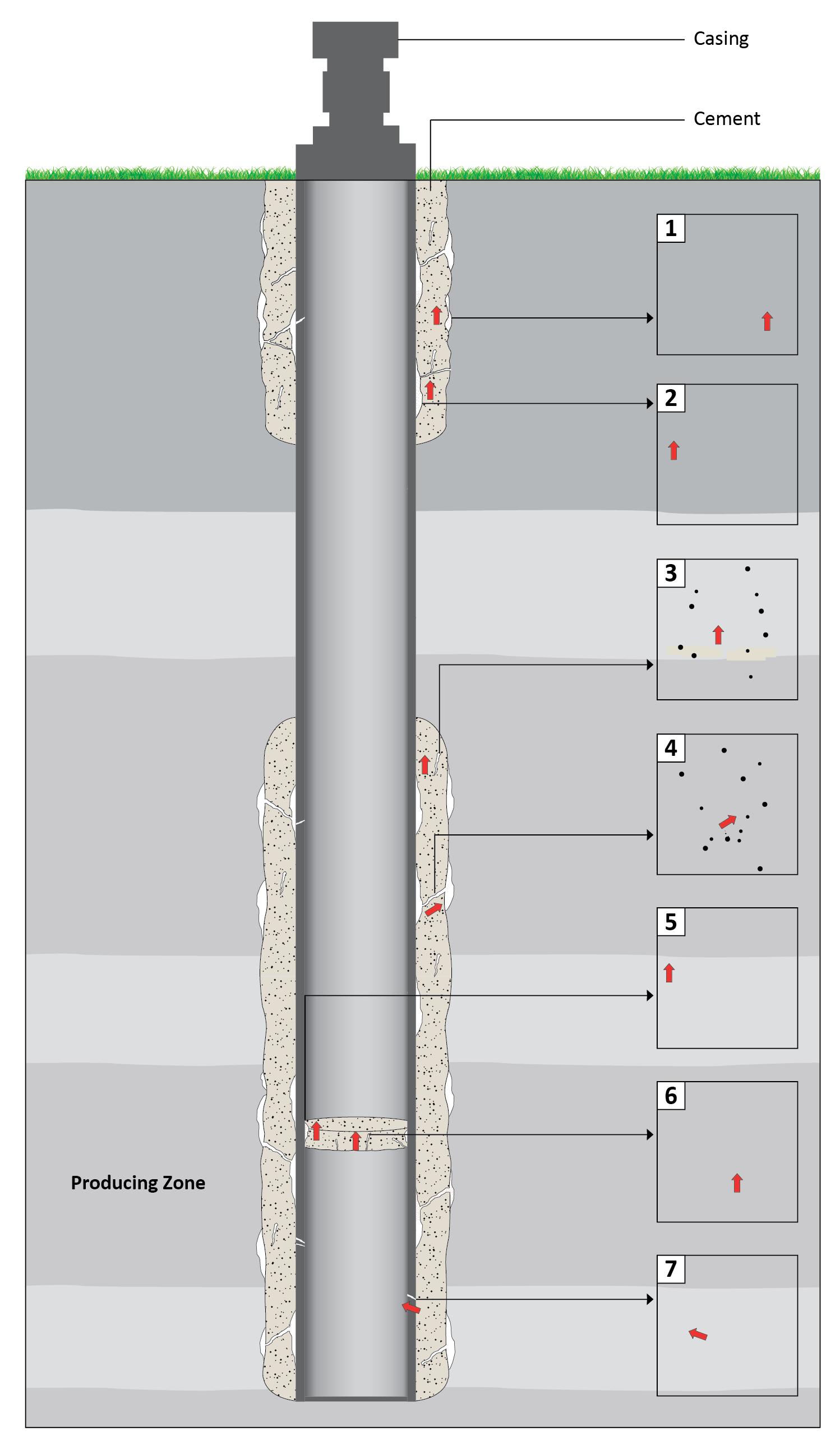
7 most common causes of cement and casing failures leading to fugitive gas emissions from a producing well. The cement plug in the lower portion of the well makes this an example of an abandoned well.

Fugitive gas emissions can arise as a result of operations in hydrocarbon exploration, such as for natural gas or petroleum.

Often, sources of methane are also sources of ethane, allowing methane emissions to be derived based on ethane emissions and ethane/methane ratios in the atmosphere. This method has given an estimate of increased methane emission from 20 Tg per year in 2008 to 35 Tg per year in 2014. A large portion of methane emissions can be contributed by only a few "super-emitters". The annual ethane emission increase rate in North America between 2009 and 2014 was 3-5%. It has been suggested that 62% of atmospheric ethane originates from leaks associated with natural gas production and transportation operations. It has also been suggested that ethane emissions measured in Europe are affected by hydraulic fracturing and shale gas production operations in North America. Some researchers postulate that leakage problems are more likely to happen in unconventional wells, which are hydraulically fractured, than in conventional wells.

Approximately 40% of methane emissions in Canada occur within Alberta, according to the National Inventory Report. Of the anthropogenic methane emissions in Alberta, 71% are generated by the oil and gas sector. It is estimated that 5% of the wells in Alberta are associated with natural gas leaking or venting. It is also estimated that 11% of all wells drilled in British Columbia, or 2739 wells out of 24599, have reported leakage problems. Some studies have estimated that 6-30% of all wells suffer gas leakage.

=== Well-specific and processing sources ===
Sources can include broken or leaky well casings (either at abandoned wells or unused, but not properly abandoned, wells) or lateral migration through the geological formations in the subsurface before being emitted to groundwater or atmosphere. Broken or leaky well casings are often the result of geochemically unstable or brittle cement. One researcher proposes 7 main paths for gas migration and surface casing vent flow: (1) between the cement and adjacent rock formation, (2) between the casing and encompassing cement, (3) between the casing and the cement plug, (4) directly through the cement plug, (5) through the cement between casing and adjacent rock formation, (6) through the cement between linking cavities from the casing side of the cement to the annulus side of the cement, and (7) through shears in the casing or well bore.

Leakage and migration can be caused by hydraulic fracturing, although in many cases the method of fracturing is such that gas is not able to migrate through the well casing. Some studies observe that hydraulic fracturing of horizontal wells does not affect the likelihood of the well suffering from gas migration. It is estimated that approximately 0.6-7.7% of methane emissions produced during the lifetime of a fossil fuel well occur during activities that take place either at the well site or during processing.

=== Pipeline and distribution sources ===
Distribution of hydrocarbon products can lead to fugitive emissions caused by leaks in seals of pipes or storage containers, improper storage practices, or transportation accidents. Some leaks may be intentional, in the case of pressure release safety valves. Some emissions may originate from unintentional equipment leaks, such as from flanges or valves. It is estimated that approximately 0.07-10% of methane emissions occur during transportation, storage, and distribution activities.

== Detection methods ==
There are several methods used to detect fugitive gas emissions. Often, measurements are taken at or near the wellheads (via the use of soil gas samples, eddy covariance towers, dynamic flux chambers connected to a greenhouse gas analyzer), but it is also possible to measure emissions using an aircraft with specialized instruments on board. An aircraft survey in northeastern British Columbia indicated emissions emanating from approximately 47% of active wells in the area. The same study suggests that actual methane emissions may be much higher than what is being reported by industry or estimated by government. For small-scale measurement projects, infrared camera leak inspections, well injection tracers, and soil gas sampling may be used. These are typically too labour-intensive to be useful to large oil and gas companies, and often airborne surveys are used instead. Other source identification methods used by industry include carbon isotope analysis of gas samples, noise logs of the production casing, and neutron logs of the cased borehole. Atmospheric measurements through both airborne or ground-based sampling are often limited in sample density due to spatial constraints or sampling duration limitations.

One way of attributing methane to a particular source is taking continuous measurements of the stable carbon isotopic measurements of atmospheric methane (δ^{13}CH_{4}) in the plume of anthropogenic methane sources using a mobile analytical system. Since different types and maturity levels of natural gas have different δ^{13}CH_{4} signatures, these measurements can be used to determine the origin of methane emissions. Activities related to natural gas emit methane plumes with a range of -41.7 to -49.7 ± 0.7‰ of δ^{13}CH_{4} signatures.

High rates of methane emissions measured in the atmosphere at a regional scale, often through airborne measurements, may not represent typical leakage rates from natural gas systems.

== Reporting and regulating emissions ==
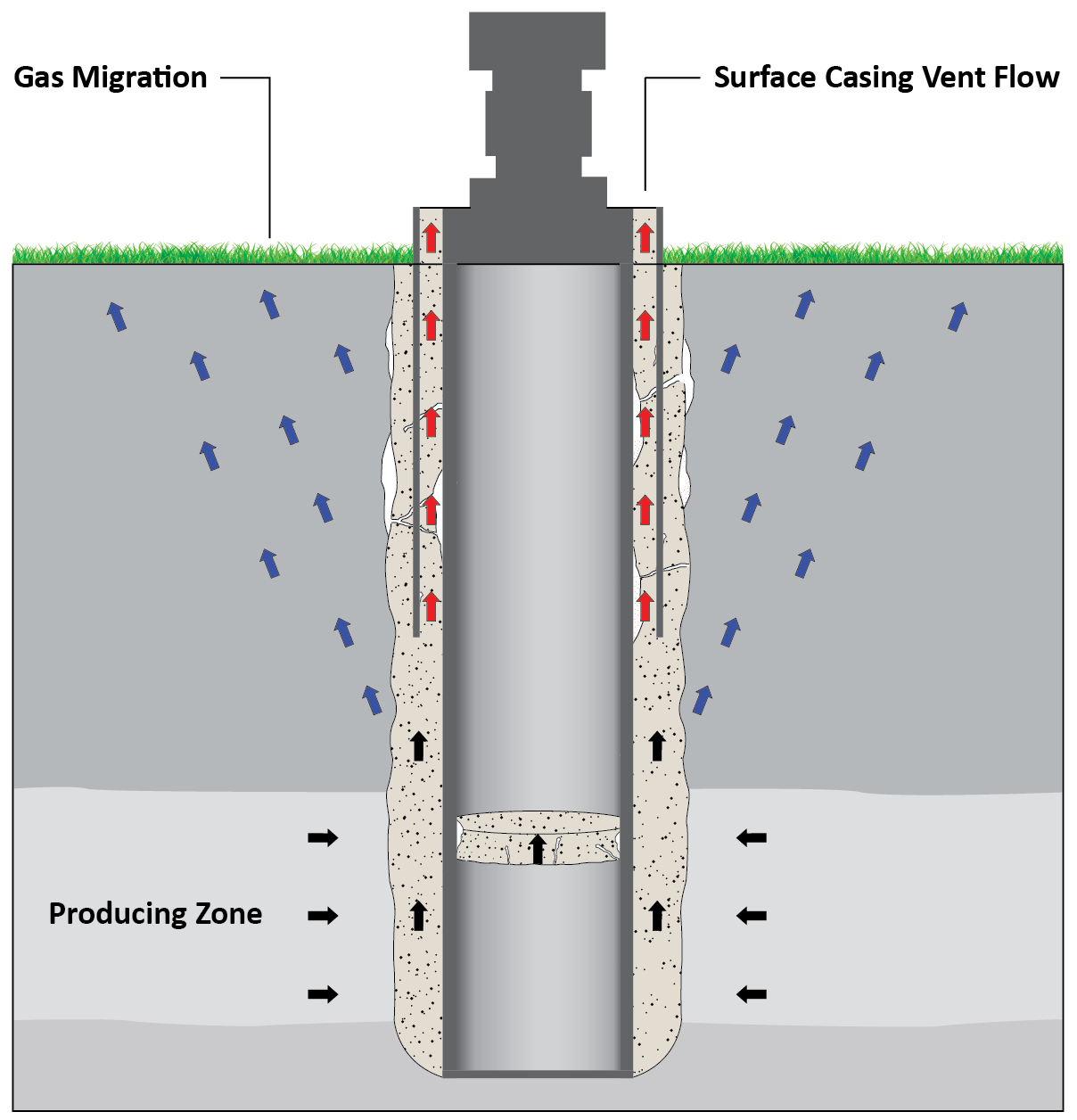
Illustration of surface casing vent flow and gas migration pathways in the subsurface near a producing well. The cement plug in the lower portion of the well makes this an example of an abandoned well.

Policies regulating reporting of fugitive gas emissions vary, and there is often an emphasis on self-reporting by companies. A necessary condition to successfully regulate greenhouse gas (GHG) emissions is the capacity to monitor and quantify the emissions before and after the regulations are in place.

Since 1993, there have been voluntary actions by the oil and gas industry in the United States to adopt new technologies that reduce methane emissions, as well as the commitment to employ best management practices to achieve methane reductions at the sector level. In Alberta, the Alberta Energy Regulator maintains a database of self-reported instances of gas migration and surface casing vent flows at wells in the province.

Reporting of leakage in British Columbia did not start until 1995, when it was required to test wells for leakage upon abandonment. Testing upon drilling of the well was not required in British Columbia until 2010. Among the 4017 wells drilled since 2010 in British Columbia, 19%, or 761 wells, have reported leakage problems. Fieldwork conducted by the David Suzuki Foundation, however, has discovered leaky wells that were not included in the British Columbia Oil and Gas Commission's (BCOGC) database, meaning that the number of leaky wells could be higher than reported. According to the BCOGC, surface casing vent flow is the major cause of leakage in wells at 90.2%, followed by gas migration at 7.1%. Based on the methane leakage rate of the reported 1493 wells that are currently leaking in British Columbia, a total leakage rate of 7070 m^{3} daily (2.5 million m^{3} yearly) is estimated, although this number may be underestimated as demonstrated by the fieldwork done by the David Suzuki Foundation.

Bottom-up inventories of leakage involve determining average leakage rates for various emission sources such as equipment, wells, or pipes, and extrapolating this to the leakage that is estimated to be the total contribution by a given company. These methods usually underestimate methane emission rates, regardless of the scale of the inventory.

=== Addressing issues stemming from fugitive gas emissions ===
There are some solutions for addressing these issues. Most of them require policy implementation or changes at the company, regulator, or government levels (or all three). Policies can include emission caps, feed-in-tariff programs, and market-based solutions such as taxes or tradeable permits.

Canada has enacted policies which include plans to reduce emissions from the oil and gas sector by 40 to 45% below 2012 levels by 2025. The Alberta government also has plans to reduce methane emissions from oil and gas operations by 45% by 2025.

Reducing fugitive gas emissions could help slow climate change, since methane has a radiative force 25 times that of carbon dioxide when considering a 100 year time frame. Once emitted, methane is also oxidized by water vapour and increases carbon dioxide concentration, leading to further climate effects.

=== Costs of reducing fugitive gas emissions ===
Costs related to implementation of policies designed to reduce fugitive gas emissions vary greatly depending on the geography, geology, and hydrology of the production and distribution areas. Often, the cost of reducing fugitive gas emissions falls to individual companies in the form of technology upgrades. This means that there is often a discrepancy between companies of different sizes as to how drastically they can financially afford to reduce their methane emissions.

== Addressing and remediating fugitive gas emissions ==
The process of intervention in the case of leaky wells affected by surface casing vent flows and gas migrations can involve perforating the intervention area, pumping fresh water and then slurry into the well, and remedial cementing of the intervention interval using methods such as bradenhead squeeze, cement squeeze, or circulation squeeze.

== See also ==
- Gas leak
- Gas venting
- Orphan wells in Alberta, Canada
