= Clay Riddell =

Canadian businessman

- Born: July 13, 1937; Treherne, Manitoba, Canada
- Died: September 15, 2018 (aged 81)
- Occupation: Businessman
- Known for: Founder and CEO, Paramount Resources
- Spouse: Vi Thorarinson (died 2012)
- Children: 4

Clayton Howard Riddell, OC (July 13, 1937 – September 15, 2018) was a Canadian billionaire businessman who was the founder, president and CEO of Paramount Resources, based in Calgary, Alberta.

== Early life ==
He was born on a farm near Treherne, Manitoba on July 13, 1937, the youngest child of Cecil Howard Riddell and Bertha Maude Riddell née Taylor. Riddell earned with a bachelor's degree in geology from the University of Manitoba.

== Career ==
He was part owner of the Calgary Flames, and high-end Calgary restaurant Catch. With an estimated net worth of US$2.5 billion (as of March 2011), he was ranked by Forbes as the 12th wealthiest Canadian and 459th in the world.

Riddell was a president of the Canadian Society of Petroleum Geologists and chair of the Canadian Association of Petroleum Producers.

The Clayton H. Riddell Faculty of Environment, Earth, and Resources at the University of Manitoba is named in his honour. He donated $10 million to create an endowment fund for the faculty, which combines the Department of Environment and Geography, the Department of Geological Sciences and the Natural Resources Institute.

In 2008, Riddell was made an Officer of the Order of Canada for his leadership and philanthropy.

In May 2010, Carleton University announced the creation of Canada's first graduate program in political management, Clayton H. Riddell Graduate Program in Political Management, made possible through a donation from Riddell that is the largest in Carleton's history.

Riddell's $15-million donation led to significant public attention and scrutiny. The program, which aimed to provide practical training for aspiring political staffers with a cross-partisan focus, was originally proposed to Carleton University by the Manning Centre for Building Democracy, founded by former Reform Party leader Preston Manning. Manning played a prominent role in the program's creation and chaired the program's steering committee.

The original donor agreement allowed the Riddell Family Charitable Foundation to appoint three out of five members of a steering committee, chaired by Manning, which had significant influence over the program's budget, hiring decisions, and curriculum. This level of donor control, coupled with Manning’s involvement, was criticized by the Canadian Association of University Teachers (CAUT) as an unprecedented infringement on academic independence. The agreement also allowed Riddell’s foundation to withhold $10-million of the pledged funds if it was unsatisfied with the program's performance after five years.

In response to the criticism, Carleton University acknowledged that the deal did not reflect the university's academic policies and renegotiated its terms in 2012. The revised agreement clarified that the steering committee, now described as a "strategic advisory" body, would no longer have the power to approve faculty hiring or curriculum changes, which would be governed solely by university policies. Manning remained on the committee in an advisory capacity under the new agreement. Despite these changes, the controversy highlighted broader concerns about the influence of private donors over public institutions in Canada, and similar concerns were raised at other Canadian universities.

== Personal life ==
He was married to Vi Thorarinson, a nurse for 49 years until her death from leukemia in 2012. They had three daughters and a son together, Lynne, Sue, Jim and Brenda. Sue Riddell Rose is the CEO of Perpetual Energy.

Riddell died on September 15, 2018, after a short illness.
