= Paramount Resources =

Canadian petroleum company

Paramount Resources Ltd.
- Type: Public
- Traded as: TSX: POU
- Industry: Conventional Oil & Natural Gas
- Founded: 1976
- Founder: Clayton H. Riddell
- Headquarters: Calgary, Alberta, Canada
- Key people: Jim Riddell (President and CEO); Bernard Lee (Executive Vice President)
- Revenue: ▼ C$1.80 billion
- Net income: ▼ C$470.2 million
- Total assets: ▲ C$4.34 billion
- Number of employees: 455
- Website: www.paramountres.com

Paramount Resources Ltd. is a Canadian petroleum company, founded in 1976. The company is involved in the exploration, development, production, processing, transportation and marketing of natural gas and its byproducts and crude oil. The company was founded by Clay Riddell.

In addition to its own name, Paramount has several subsidiaries with names resembling those of Hollywood companies, including Fox Drilling, Summit Resources, and Pixar Petroleum. It also retains significant investment in MGM Energy, which it spun off in 2007.

In 2017, Paramount acquired Apache Canada Ltd. for C$459.5 million and merged with Trilogy Energy Corp which itself was originally spun-off from Paramount.

In January 2023, Paramount divested assets in the Kaybob Region near Fox Creek, Alberta to Crescent Point Energy for net cash of C$370.0 million.

Paramount reported an output of 96,393 barrels of oil equivalent per day (BOE/D) in its 2023 annual report, published in March 2024.
