= Asset retirement obligation =

An Asset Retirement Obligation (ARO) is a legal obligation associated with the retirement of a tangible long-lived asset in which the timing or method of settlement may be conditional on a future event, the occurrence of which may not be within the control of the entity burdened by the obligation. In the United States, ARO accounting is specified by Statement of Financial Accounting Standards (SFAS, or FAS) 143, which is Topic 410-20 in the Accounting Standards Codification published by the Financial Accounting Standards Board. Entities covered by International Financial Reporting Standards (IFRS) apply a standard called IAS 37 to AROs, where the AROs are called "provisions". ARO accounting is particularly significant for remediation work needed to restore a property, such as decontaminating a nuclear power plant site, removing underground fuel storage tanks, cleanup around an oil well, or removal of improvements to a site. It does not apply to unplanned cleanup costs, such as costs incurred as a result of an accident.

Firms must recognize the ARO liability in the period in which it was incurred, such as at the time of acquisition or construction. The liability equals the present value of the expected cost of retirement/remediation. An asset equal to the initial liability is added to the balance sheet, and depreciated over the life of the asset. The result is an increase in both assets and liabilities, while the total expected cost is recognized over time, with the accrual steadily increasing on a compounded basis.

== An ARO example ==
A company builds a gas station, with underground tanks to store the fuel. The tanks have an estimated life of 40 years (or, alternatively, the station site is leased for 40 years). The current cost to remove the tanks is $15,000. The company estimates future inflation for this type of work to be 2.5% per year. The company's credit-adjusted risk-free rate (cost of borrowing) is 9%.

The estimated future cost of removing the tanks in 40 years is $15,000 * (1.025 ^ 40) = $40,275.96. The present value of this cost is $40,275.96 / (1.09 ^ 40) = $1,282.29. At installation of the tanks, the company books an asset retirement cost (asset) and an asset retirement obligation (liability) of $1,282.29. The asset is depreciated, usually straight-line, over 40 years (depreciation expense of $32.06 per year). The liability is accreted (interest for each period is calculated and added to the balance), using the interest method. (Accretion expense would be $115.41 the first year, $125.79 the second year, etc.) Over the 40 year life, the liability thereby increases to $40,275.96. At retirement of the tank, the expenses actually incurred to remove the tank are booked against the ARO, and a gain or loss is recognized for the difference.

The increase of assets and liabilities by $1,282 will affect financial ratios, for example return on assets will decline, debt-to-equity ratio will increase, etc.

Calculations are somewhat different under IAS 37, because the discount rate is regularly recalculated during the life of the ARO to reflect current market conditions. Whenever the rate changes, the present value is recalculated, and both the asset and liability are adjusted by the amount of the difference.

== See also ==
- Terminal value
- Discounted cash flow
