= Alberta Energy Regulator =

Canadian provincial agency

Agency overview
- Formed: 1938
- Jurisdiction: Alberta
- Agency executive: Laurie Pushor, President and Chief Executive Officer
- Parent department: Ministry of Energy, Alberta Environment and Protected Areas
- Website: www.aer.ca

The Alberta Energy Regulator (AER) is a quasi-judicial, independent agency regulating the development of energy resources in Alberta. Headquartered in Calgary, the AER's mandate under the Responsible Energy Development Act (REDA) is "to provide for the efficient, safe, orderly and environmentally responsible development of energy resources and mineral resources in Alberta.”

Responsible for all projects from application to reclamation, the AER administers the Public Lands Act, the Environmental Protection and Enhancement Act and the Water Act.

The AER operates at arm's length from the Government of Alberta, under an appointed board of directors.

== Background ==
Energy regulation in Alberta has evolved over time to meet changing technologies and public needs. Since the creation of the Petroleum and Natural Gas Conservation Board in 1938, the regulatory body has consistently overseen energy development in the province.

It has existed under several names throughout its history, including the Alberta Oil and Gas Conservation Board, the Alberta Energy and Utilities Board, and the Alberta Energy Resources Conservation Board. The AER builds off of this legacy, but it is now, under the REDA, an entirely new organization with new regulatory functions and authority over energy-related applications and developments.

In December 2012, REDA passed in the Alberta Legislature as part of the Regulatory Enhancement Project. On 17 June 2013, all regulatory functions previously carried out by the Energy Resources Conservation Board were taken over by the AER.

== Responsibilities ==
The AER "ensures the safe, efficient, orderly, and environmentally responsible development of hydrocarbon resources over their entire life cycle. This includes allocating and conserving water resources, managing public lands, and environmental protection while providing economic benefits for all Albertans." These hydrocarbon resources are among the world's largest reserves at 167 billion barrels of bitumen and crude oil, 33.7 trillion cubic feet of natural gas, and 37 billion tons of coal. The AER also regulates the infrastructure associated with these reserves, including a provincial pipeline network of 415,000 kilometres (km), over 181,000 operating wells, more than 50,000 oil and gas facilities, over 200 thermal oil sands projects, nine oil sands mines, 11 coal mines, and four coal processing plants.

The Government of Alberta has granted the AER authority to review and make decisions on proposed energy developments, to oversee all aspects of energy resource activities in accordance with government policies, to regularly inspect energy activities to ensure that all applicable requirements are met, to penalize companies that fail to comply with AER requirements, and to hold hearings on proposed energy developments. As the single regulator, it is responsible for all energy-related applications under the Environmental Protection and Enhancement Act, the Water Act, the Public Lands Act, and the Mines and Minerals Act. The AER also responds to concerns from landowners, First Nations, industry, and other stakeholders regarding energy regulations in Alberta and mediates disputes surrounding energy projects.

In the past the Energy Resources Conservation Board and Alberta Environment conducted investigations separately, but, with the creation of a single regulatory body for energy developments, the AER now conducts investigations and inspections to ensure compliance with all regulatory, environmental, and safety requirements. The AER can enforce industry compliance with regulations using tools that include more frequent and detailed inspections, more stringent planning requirements, enforcement orders, shutting down operations, administrative penalties, (Note: Administrative penalties under the Responsible Energy Development Act, unlike separate criminal penalties, are limited to $500,000 or less for a corporation and $50,000 or less for an individual, for each individual infraction.) and prosecution. The AER regularly posts details of compliance activities on the AER website, which also includes copies of all investigation reports.

Since the Energy Resources Conservation Board (ERCB) was succeeded by AER, as part of their succession title pages of all existing ERCB directives such as Directive 074 regarding oil sands tailings ponds performance dated 3 February 2009, now carry the AER logo.

== Governance structure ==
Under the AER's governance structure, the board of directors determines the general direction of the regulator rather than overseeing the AER's day-to-day operations and decisions – these are the responsibility of the chief executive officer. The CEO receives and makes decisions on applications, monitors and investigates energy resource activities for compliance, and oversees the closure of energy developments, including reclamation and remediation of the land.

Hearing commissioners constitute another part of the AER's structure. They conduct all hearings into energy applications and regulatory appeals, in addition to helping to develop the organization's hearing procedures and rules as well as other day-to-day operations. Hearing commissioners are independent adjudicators, and their decisions may only be reviewed by the Court of Appeal of Alberta.

=== Funding ===
The AER is 100 per cent funded by industry and is authorized to collect funds through an administrative fee levied on oil and gas wells, oil sands mines, and coal mines. The industry-funded model is sometimes used by regulatory agencies in Canada, such as the Alberta Utilities Commission and the BC Oil and Gas Commission. Its budget is established through a formal process between the Government of Alberta's Treasury Board and the AER, and the budget must be approved by the Government of Alberta. The AER has an annual budget of more than $165 million and more than 1200 staff working in 15 locations across Alberta.

== Criticism ==
Critics raised concerns the AER would lead to less transparency in the regulation of the oil, gas and coal industry and would weaken environmental protection. Alberta Surface Rights Group, the United Landowners of Alberta, First Nations, farmers and ranchers have expressed concerns about the streamlining of regulatory processes that may benefit oil and gas industries at their expense. Energy Minister Ken Hughes argued that the Policy Management Office would oversee AER when it takes over from Environment and Sustainable Resource Development (ESRD) in issuing permits related to water and to the environment. The Canadian Association of Petroleum Producers (CAPP) welcomes the change that will streamline access to water and environmental permits for oil companies, by creating a one-stop-shop with "much needed clarity". Rachel Notley, Alberta New Democrat's environment critic, expressed concern that the security of water and the environment would be compromised if the all decisions relating to development in the energy sector—including oil, gas and coal—are regulated under the AER, which is entirely funded by these industries. Prior to REDA, the Alberta Environment regulated these permits under three provincial laws, the Water Act, the Public Lands Act, and the Environmental Protection and Enhancement Act.

In June 2015, Alberta Premier Rachel Notley expressed concerns that the AER appeared to have a "conflicting mandate" as both an energy promoter and "the primary vehicle of environmental protection in Alberta" and considered splitting it. She was concerned that AER had "responsibility for most of the environmental protection and monitoring part and standards development within the energy sector." Some in the oil industry insiders, such as Bill Andrew, CEO of Long Run Exploration, supports splitting up "AER's functions because the current regulator has too much on its plate". Others, however such as Gary Leach, president of the Explorers and Producers Association of Canada, argue that AER's primary role is "environmental protection, public safety and resource conservation – not the promotion of energy development," and that the "many jurisdictions in North America and around the world" see AER "as a leading regulator for energy projects."

On 5 October 2019, three independent investigations into AER's International Centre of Regulatory Excellence (ICORE), submitted their findings. In response to a whistle-blower complaint, the three agencies—the Alberta Ethics Commissioner Marguerite Trussler, the Public Interest Commissioner, and the Auditor General had undertaken launched separate probes into the AER in 2018.

Global New's request for a freedom of information resulted in the release of AER CEO Laurie Pushor's 20 April 2020 "internal briefing note" consisting of 60 pages of emails.

Between 2020 and 2023, AER and Imperial Oil conspired to hide an ongoing and massive tailings pond seepage at the Kearl Oil Sands resulting in the release of over 5.6 million litres of contaminated wastewater into the nearby ecosystem. Provincial Minister of Energy and Minerals, Brian Jean, visited the Kearl site and applauded Imperial's "commitment to environmental protection" as "top notch", days before the AER announced another 670,000 litre leakage. Jean deflected criticisms, claiming that "it's just muddy water". On March 6, 2024, the Athabasca Chipewyan First Nation sued the AER for $500 million alleging "negligence, nuisance, breach of the duty to consult, breach of the Honour of the Crown, breach of fiduciary duty and unjustified Treaty infringement." The AER subsequently imposed on Imperial administrative penalties of $50,000 for failing to report the leak for over nine months.

== See also ==
- Athabasca oil sands
- Duty to consult and accommodate
- Environmental impact of mining
- History of the petroleum industry in Canada (oil sands and heavy oil)
- Natural Resources Acts
- Orphan wells in Alberta, Canada
- The Alberta Geological Survey
