= Air pollution in British Columbia =

Environmental issue in British Columbia, Canada

Air pollution is a concern in British Columbia (BC), Canada because of its effects on health and visibility. Air quality is influenced in BC by numerous mountain ranges and valleys, which complicate atmospheric pollution dispersion and can lead to high concentrations of pollutants such as particulate matter from wood smoke (especially during stagnant atmospheric conditions/inversions).

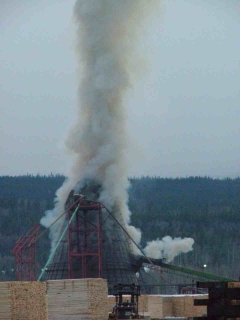
Beehive burner smoke

== Air quality in BC ==
Air quality in much of BC is good compared to many areas of North America. This is particularly true for cities in BC such as the Greater Vancouver area and Victoria.

Valley communities such as Golden may experience periods of poor air quality, particularly during stagnant atmospheric conditions. Two communities currently exceed the federal standards for maximum safe levels of pollutants: Prince George for particulate matter (PM2.5), and the community of Hope in the lower Fraser Valley for ozone. Other communities are close to the PM2.5 standard, such as Quesnel, Kamloops, Chiliwack, and Langley.

Hourly air quality monitoring results are available for the lower Fraser Valley. Air quality information is available for the rest of the province from the Ministry of the Environment. The BC Lung Association produces an annual State of the Air Report for BC. This report is a collaboration between the provincial, federal and regional governments responsible for air quality management in BC.

An important recent consideration is the nearly complete replacement of the TEOM (Tapered Element Oscillating Microbalance) pollution measurement instruments once relied on by BC with newer SHARP FEM (Federal Equivalency Method) monitors. The TEOMs often under-reported particulate matter measurements by 50%. A process of colocation and auditing of operations will make the new and higher readings more reliable. A more complete understanding of conditions will lead to a greater understanding of likely impacts and may drive increased regulatory efforts.

These measurements sample ambient air – that is, air where people might breathe it – and are usually reliable and available. They do not include the air in workplaces. A possibly trickier assessment is determining where pollution comes from, often a question addressed by emissions inventories. In BC and other Canadian jurisdictions, facilities are required to report their toxic substance emissions to Environment Canada on an annual basis. Self-reporting tends to lead to under-reporting, notwithstanding which the inventory resulting tracks releases in an interesting way. At the NPRI we can see a complex example in the historical report summary of Canfor's NPRI reporting in recent years. Criticisms of such reporting has been done by Scott Vaughan, Commissioner for Sustainable Development and the Environment in his Fall 2009 report.

It is worth noting that the government only recently began addressing air quality when the problem was increasingly associated with health issues and generated complaints about smog and poor visibility. There is no major agency for air quality at the provincial and federal levels. The BC Ministry of Environment added a branch in 1980 for air quality and it received a small budget annually for almost a decade. After the 1990s, resources allocated to air quality grew rapidly and this was particularly the case for the Greater Vancouver Regional District (GVRD) through its air management plan.

== Sources of air pollution ==
Air pollution sources in British Columbia may be divided between those external to the province, such as transboundary pollution, and those internal to it; and between anthropogenic (man-made) sources and natural sources. External anthropogenic sources include combustion particles and gases from industrial sources in the province of Alberta or the U.S. state of Washington. Toxic substances form part of these pollutants such as tetrachloroethylene and trichloroethylene as well as nitrogen monoxide and sulfur dioxide, which Canada seeks to minimize through caps and its tradable permit system. Mount St. Helens has been a significant external natural source: although located entirely in the United States, its eruption created air pollution in parts of British Columbia.

Exhaust from internal combustion engines (mainly automobiles and trucks, as well as marine vessels in coastal waters) is a major internal anthropogenic source. Other human-caused sources include: Industrial, agricultural (e.g. manure spreading), commercial operations (e.g., dry cleaners and gas stations) and home heating appliances (furnaces, fireplaces). Radionuclides are generally not a concern with regards to air pollution issues in BC, except for radon gas. Background pollution occurs in areas not directly affected by pollution sources.

== Pollution law ==
The Canadian Constitution does not clearly specify the level of government that has responsibility for environmental protection in Canada. As such, pollution law in British Columbia is divided among local, regional, provincial, federal and international jurisdictions, each with its own focus and, at times, overlapping concerns. Legislation may be enacted at any of these levels.

=== Provincial air quality law ===
Provincial environmental regulation is largely contained in BC's Environmental Management Act, which defines an air contaminant as follows:

"air contaminant" means a substance that is introduced into the air and that

- (a) injures or is capable of injuring the health or safety of a person,
- (b) injures or is capable of injuring property or any life form,
- (c) interferes with or is capable of interfering with visibility,
- (d) interferes with or is capable of interfering with the normal conduct of business,
- (e) causes or is capable of causing material physical discomfort to a person, or
- (f) damages or is capable of damaging the environment;"

The EMA is the enabling legislation for BC's industrial emissions permits.

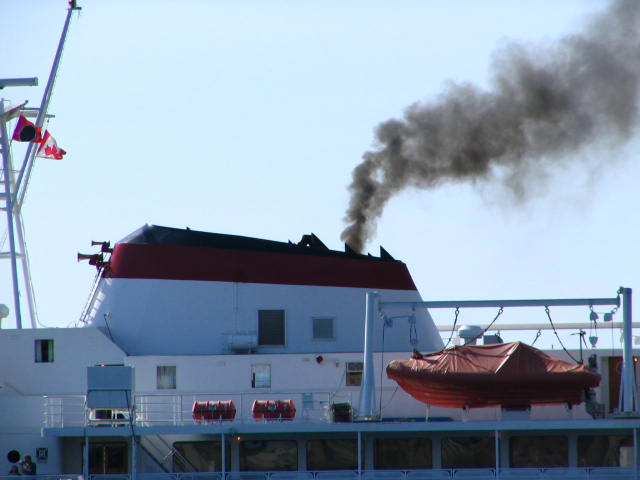
Marine vessel emissions in BC

=== Federal air quality law ===
Federal pollution law is largely embodied in the Canadian Environmental Protection Act (CEPA) and its associated schedules. The act of scheduling a toxin under CEPA starts a process of elimination or virtual elimination from the Canadian environment.

The National Pollutant Release Inventory indexes sources by pollutant and location.

In 2012 the CCME started the Air Quality Management System process. This provided for the evaluation of PM and ozone measurements at many sites in BC and across Canada. In 2015 the first air zone reports for BC were published. They show that Houston, Smithers, and Vanderhoof are not meeting the PM2.5 standard. This is a trigger for corrective intervention. The exact type of intervention is not yet determined, partly because it's a new process and partly because of variable site-specific factors. It's not likely that one size fits all in correction.

Pollution law governing emissions from marine vessels is complicated; Transport Canada holds primary authority for regulating ship traffic in Canada, while the International Maritime Organization governs global shipping rules (including pollution from marine vessels). Environment Canada and other agencies are working to better understand and address this issue, which is increasingly important due to growing international trade.

=== Regional and municipal air quality law ===
Within the province, various Regional Districts and municipalities have enacted laws to control pollution. There are also area-based plans to manage pollution along geographic lines that recognize airsheds instead of political boundaries. This system is especially relevant to BC because of its mountainous topography. The BC Environmental Management Act recognizes airsheds and notes that managers under the Act "may give consideration" to them, but their full legal status is uncertain. Some plans have had a considerable effect, and this trend is likely to continue.

The Greater Vancouver Regional District (GVRD) has a clearly defined role in air pollution control and has delegated authority from the province (Montreal is the only other jurisdiction in Canada with this delegated authority). The Fraser Valley Regional District has delegated authority to plan but not manage air quality.

British Columbia is a participant in the Canadian Council of Ministers of the Environment (CCME), which includes processes for fine particulates and ground-level ozone. Because BC generally has lower levels of pollution than the standards set by the Environmental Protection Act, the CI/KCAC ("Continuous Improvement" and "Keeping Clean Areas Clean") principle of the federal strategy is of special importance.

International law and treaties such as the Kyoto Accord further affect air pollution in BC.

The precautionary principle embodied in international agreements is gaining recognition in Canada and BC as a guide to interpreting pollution law. Its exact application is uncertain but it is cited in the preamble to the Canadian Environmental Protection Act as a principle guiding the Government of Canada.

== Health effects ==
The health effects of air pollution vary with the size and characteristics of the exposed population, the specific pollutant or mix of pollutants and the concentration of pollutants, both in the short term and the long term. Children, the elderly, and people with pre-existing health problems are known to be especially vulnerable. Generally speaking, respiratory and cardiac effects are the most significant, but there is increasing evidence that air pollutants play a role in cancer and genetic mutations, some of which can be inherited. Cumulative and synergistic effects are hard to study: ethical concerns rule out some otherwise desirable experimental procedures, and multi-pollutant studies are complex and expensive, leaving these areas less well understood experimentally. Sometimes ecologic studies can contribute to our understanding of combined effects. In the early 1990s, the province commissioned Dr. Sverre Vedal, then a researcher at the University of British Columbia, to investigate air pollution in BC, and to assess and to rank its health impacts. His report concluded that particulate pollution was the gravest concern, estimating an annual toll of 82 deaths, among other consequences. As of late 2004, the province continues its long-term effort to control sources of particulates. The varying population and topography have given rise to different problems in different areas, necessitating differing approaches. Other important air pollutants are oxides of nitrogen and of sulphur, volatile organic compounds of various kinds, polycyclic aromatic hydrocarbons, dioxins and furans. Exposure and health effects of these vary by area and sometimes by season.

Recent air pollution research in Canada and other jurisdictions was summarized by Health Canada in October 2003 in its report Human Health Effects of Fine Particulate Matter, which has informed standards-setting deliberations of the CCME. Research in British Columbia has been ongoing since at least 1990. The BC Lung Association has commissioned work in this field, including a 2003 analysis by Dr. David Bates and others, Health and Air Quality 2002—Phase 1. The second phase of this report was to deal with health effects of fine particulates in northern BC communities, where biomass combustion is arguably the most important source. Ray Copes and Catherine Elliott estimated mortality in northern BC in their report.

At the end of 2004, Provincial Health Officer Dr. Perry Kendall released his annual report titled Air Quality in British Columbia, A Public Health Perspective. It includes estimates of the health impact of air pollution in BC. He estimates that 71–110 deaths are attributable to air pollution. This figure excludes effects of indoor air pollution and environmental tobacco smoke exposure.

On a national and regional scale, the Canadian Medical Association in 2008 quantified the illness costs of air pollution. The report includes business-as-usual projections of the increased burden in the coming decades.

== Air Quality Health Index ==
The Air Quality Health Index, or AQHI, is a scale designed to help understand the impact of air quality on health. It is a health protection tool used to make decisions to reduce short-term exposure to air pollution by adjusting activity levels during increased levels of air pollution. The Air Quality Health Index also provides advice on how to improve air quality by proposing a behavioral change to reduce the ecological footprint. This index pays particular attention to people who are sensitive to air pollution. It provides them with advice on how to protect their health during air quality levels associated with low, moderate, high, and very high health risks.

The Air Quality Health Index, or "AQHI", is a federal program jointly coordinated by Health Canada and Environment Canada. However, the AQHI program would not be possible without the commitment and support of the provinces, municipalities, and NGOs. From air quality monitoring to health risk communication and community engagement, local partners are responsible for the vast majority of work-related to AQHI implementation.

Originally launched as a pilot project in the British Columbia Interior and Nova Scotia in 2005, it is currently implemented in 49 locations across Canada.

The Air Quality Health Index provides a number from 1 to 10+ to indicate the level of health risk associated with local air quality. Occasionally, when the amount of air pollution is abnormally high, the number may exceed 10. The AQHI provides a local air quality current value as well as a local air quality maximums forecast for today, tonight, and tomorrow and provides associated health advice.

1	2	3	4	5	6	7	8	9	10	+

Risk:	Low (1–3)	Moderate (4–6)	High (7–10)	Very high (above 10)

As it is now known that even low levels of air pollution can trigger discomfort for the sensitive population, the index has been developed as a continuum: The higher the number, the greater the health risk and need to take precautions. The index describes the level of health risk associated with this number as 'low', 'moderate', 'high' or 'very high', and suggests steps that can be taken to reduce exposure.

Health Risk	Air Quality Health Index	Health Messages	
		At Risk population	*General Population
Low	1–3	Enjoy your usual outdoor activities.	Ideal air quality for outdoor activities
Moderate	4–6	Consider reducing or rescheduling strenuous activities outdoors if you are experiencing symptoms.	No need to modify your usual outdoor activities unless you experience symptoms such as coughing and throat irritation.
High	7–10	Reduce or reschedule strenuous activities outdoors. Children and the elderly should also take it easy.	Consider reducing or rescheduling strenuous activities outdoors if you experience symptoms such as coughing and throat irritation.
Very high	Above 10	Avoid strenuous activities outdoors. Children and the elderly should also avoid outdoor physical exertion.	Reduce or reschedule strenuous activities outdoors, especially if you experience symptoms such as coughing and throat irritation.
Air Quality Health Index Categories and Health Messages – Environment and Climate Change Canada

== See also ==
- Canadian Association of Physicians for the Environment
- Canadian Environmental Protection Act, 1999
- David Suzuki Foundation
- Ecojustice Canada
- Environmental Health Perspectives
- Health Effects Institute
- National Pollutant Release Inventory
- West Coast Environmental Law
