= Earthjustice =

US environmental litigation organization

- Formation: 1971; 55 years ago
- Founder: Phil Berry; Fred Fisher; Don Harris
- Type: 501(c)(3) organization
- Tax ID no.: 94-1730465
- Purpose: Environmentalism, Public health
- Headquarters: San Francisco, California, United States
- Method: Litigation
- President: Abigail Dillen
- Website: www.earthjustice.org
- Formerly called: Sierra Club Legal Defense Fund; Earthjustice Legal Defense Fund

Earthjustice (originally Sierra Club Legal Defense Fund) is a nonprofit public interest organization based in the United States dedicated to litigating environmental issues. Headquartered in San Francisco, they have an international program, a communications team, and a policy and legislation team in Washington, D.C., along with 14 regional offices across the United States.

The organization was founded in 1971 as the Sierra Club Legal Defense Fund, though it was fully independent from the Sierra Club. The name was changed to Earthjustice in 1997. This was thought to better reflect its role as a legal advocate which represents hundreds of regional, national and international organizations. As of September 2018, the group has provided free legal representation to more than 1,000 clients ranging from the Sierra Club, World Wildlife Fund, American Lung Association, as well as smaller state and community groups, such as the Maine Lobstermen's Association and the Friends of the Everglades.

Earthjustice is a nonprofit organization, meaning the legal service they provide is free for their clients. Funding for the organization comes from donations. It does not receive any funding from corporations or governments. In 2021, Earthjustice made $154 million in total revenue and $100 million in total expenditures. As of 2021, Earthjustice has full-time staff of about 170 attorneys in 14 offices across the United States, and 14 public-interest lobbyists based in Washington, D.C. They are involved in 630 active legal proceedings. The current president of Earthjustice is Abigail Dillen, an environmental attorney who first joined Earthjustice in 2000 and was previously Vice President of Litigation for Climate and Energy.

== Programs ==
Earthjustice's work is divided into three key goal areas:

- The Wild – focus on cases in The Arctic to preserve the ecosystem from climate change and fossil fuel drilling; in the ocean ecosystem to protect from overfishing, pollution, and habitat loss; in the wild to preserve wild places and support biodiversity; and cases related to saving wildlife from extinction due to clear cutting, oil drilling, dams, dewatering streams, and climate change.
- Healthy Communities – focus on cases at both the regional and national level which protect against pollution and toxic chemicals. Earthjustice uses litigation to apply and enforce the Clean Air and the Clean Water Act, and reform the toxics regulatory system.
- Clean Energy and a Stable Climate – focus on reducing the utilization of fossil fuels, eliminate barriers to, and create incentives for the use of renewable energy sources (such as through the Right To Zero campaign), and cases that promote ecological resiliency to withstand warming global temperatures. Through litigation, Earthjustice establishes and enforces national regulation for coal ash waste, retires old coal-fired power plants, prevents coal exports, and stops coal mining. Cases in this key area also focus on preventing fracking, preventing oil and gas drilling on public lands, strengthening environmental and health protections, and preventing fossil fuel infrastructure investments.

Earthjustice also partners with organizations from other regions, including Latin America, Russia, Japan, and China to promote the development of environmental law in their respective countries. Every year, Earthjustice submits a country-by-country report on Human Rights and the Environment to the United Nations.

== Impact on U.S. environmental law ==
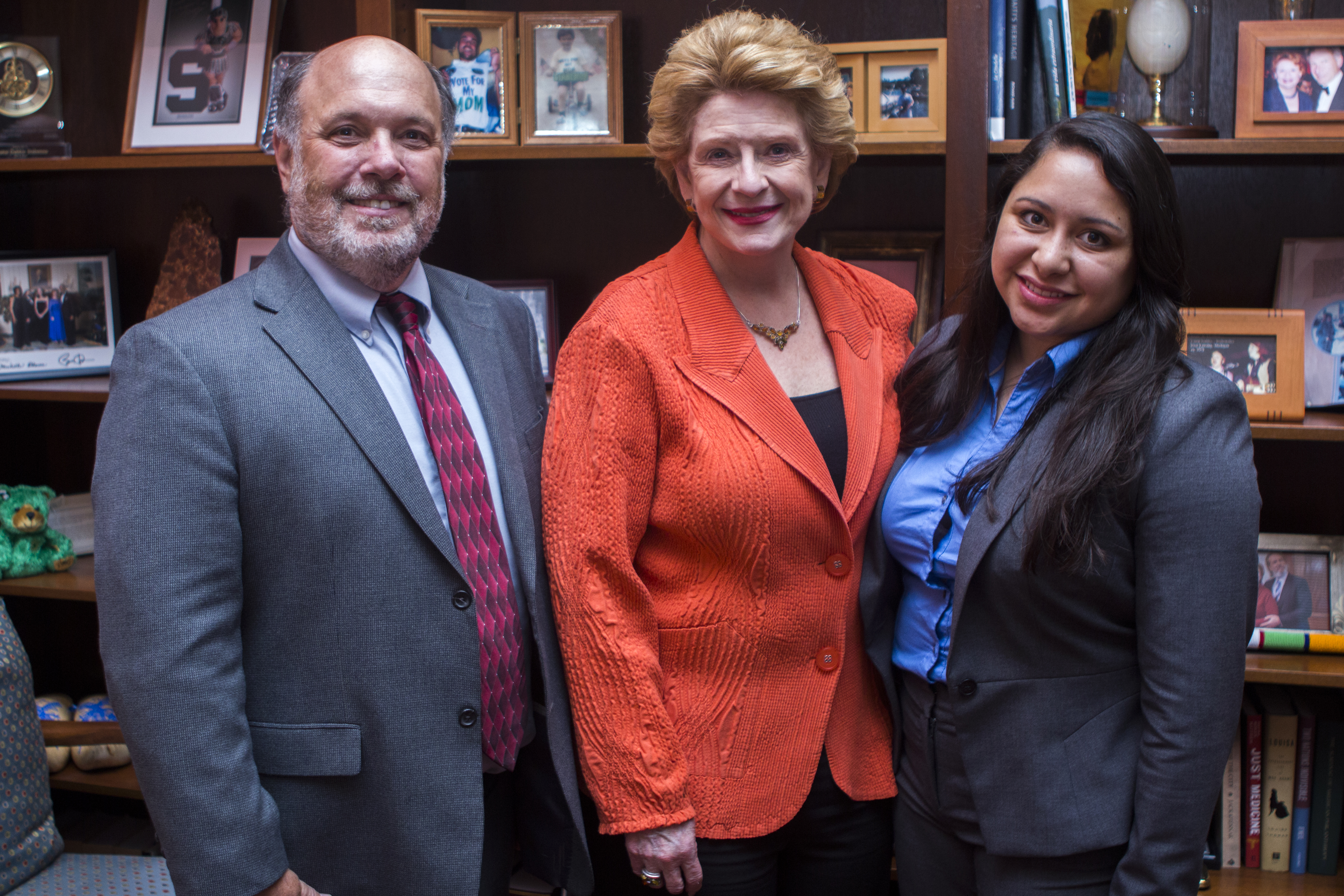
Senator Stabenow meets with members of Earthjustice, 2016.

Earthjustice has been a critical player in a number of important, precedent-setting cases regarding environmental protection in the United States.

In the 1972 Supreme Court case Sierra Club v. Morton, Earthjustice (then known as the Sierra Club Legal Defense Fund) helped establish the right of citizens to sue for environmental damages. The case ultimately forced the Walt Disney Company to drop its plans to develop an enormous ski resort in the Mineral King valley in California's Sierra Nevada Range. The lawsuit blocked any further development or private use of the land which has since been incorporated into the Sequoia National Park.

In 1993, the organization (still then known as the Sierra Club Legal Defense Fund) filed a lawsuit to block the development of the New World gold-silver-copper mine that was planned to be sited about four miles from the northeast entrance to Yellowstone National Park. The lawsuit was a victory in that the district judge ruled that not only could the subsidiary mining company (in this case Crown Butte Mines, Inc., a Montana company) who holds the mining claims and is developing the mine plan be held liable, but even the parent corporation (in this case Noranda Corporation, a Canadian company), could be held liable for violations of the Federal Clean Water Act (Ekey, 1997).

In 1998, Earthjustice helped local community groups convince the U.S. Nuclear Regulatory Commission to withdraw an approval to construct a uranium enrichment plant between two low-income, predominantly African-American communities near Homer, Louisiana. It was the first time a government agency had formally embraced the principle of "environmental justice" in its decision-making.

In the 2006 Supreme Court case Massachusetts v. Environmental Protection Agency, Earthjustice attorneys helped a coalition of state governments and conservation groups force the U.S. Environmental Protection Agency (EPA) to fight global warming by limiting greenhouse gas emissions. It was the first Supreme Court case to ever address the issue of climate change.

In 2020, a federal court granted a request by the Standing Rock Sioux Tribe to strike down federal permits for the controversial Dakota Access Pipeline, finding that the U.S. Army Corps of Engineers violated the National Environmental Policy Act when it affirmed federal permits for the pipeline originally issued in 2016.

Other suits have been less successful:

In 2008, the Supreme Court ruled in favor of the US Navy in a suit brought in part by Earthjustice, which ordered Navy personnel to stop the use of certain types of sonar if a marine mammal such as a dolphin or whale was sighted within 2,200 yards. Among other details, the court noted that in 40 years of such sonar training there had not been a documented case of injury or death to a marine mammal that could be directly attributed to the sonar.

In 2017, the Ninth Circuit Court of Appeals rejected a suit against the EPA with the goal of banning the pesticide chlorpyrifos. The court ruled that an environmental coalition, including Earthjustice, failed to follow procedure by filing the suit with the court before filing their appeal of a 2007 EPA ruling allowing the pesticide. However, on August 9, 2018, the court ruled that chlorpyrifos must be banned within 60 days from that date.

On-going cases include:

Since June 2025, Earthjustice and attorney Paul Schwiep provide legal counsel to a coalition led by Friends of the Everglades, the Center for Biological Diversity, and the Miccosukee Tribe of Indians, seeking an injunction against the installation of the South Florida Detention Facility. Located in the Everglades, home of the Florida Panther and the Florida bonneted bat, Earthjustice argues the Florida camp is managed in violatation of the National Environmental Policy Act, tribal cultural-resource protections, and the Government in the Sunshine Act.

== Legislative positions ==
- Opposed Reducing Excessive Deadline Obligations Act of 2013 (H.R. 2279; 113th Congress), a bill that would "amend laws concerning the Environmental Protection Agency's (EPA's) oversight of hazardous substances."

== Marketing ==
In 2010, Earthjustice launched a fundraising campaign using the location-based social networking app Foursquare. The ad campaign, which ran in billboards in San Francisco's BART system, gained national recognition as one of the first successful nonprofit uses of Foursquare. This success was featured in media outlets such as The New York Times, Mashable, and MacLife magazine, as well as books such as Carmine Gallo's The Power of Foursquare.

== Recognition ==
In 2001, Worth magazine, aimed at high-income Americans, named Earthjustice as one of America's 100 best charities.

In 2009, Kevin Mooney of the right-leaning Capital Research Center wrote that Earthjustice had represented a wide range of clients and causes, ranging from those "well within the political and scientific mainstream" including Natural Resources Defense Council, the Wilderness Society (United States), and Greenpeace to more obscure state and local groups such as the California Wilderness Coalition and the North Carolina Wildlife Federation, to "radical fringe groups with a reputation for outrageous claims and uncompromising positions", such as protection of the Dugong.

Since April 1, 2009, Charity Navigator has given Earthjustice 4 stars, the oversight group's highest rating.

In December 2014, the organization was recognized for its tagline "Because the earth needs a good lawyer", which was chosen in a 2009 online contest as one of the best nonprofit taglines out of 1,702 entries.

== See also ==
- List of environmental organizations
- Canadian Environmental Law Association (CELA)
- Center for International Environmental Law (CIEL)
- West Coast Environmental Law
- Environmental Dispute Resolution Fund
- Conservation ethic
- Environmental movement
- Habitat conservation
- Clean Power Plan § Proposed actions under President Trump

== Bibliography ==
- Tom Turner, with photographs by Carr Clifton, Wild by Law: The Sierra Club Legal Defense Fund and the Places It Has Saved (San Francisco: Sierra Club Legal Defense Fund and Sierra Club Books, 1990) ISBN 0-87156-627-3
- Tom Turner, Justice on Earth: Earthjustice and the People It Has Served (White River Junction, VT: Chelsea Green Publishing Co., 2002) ISBN 1-931498-31-8
