= Ecojustice Canada =

Nonprofit environmental law organization

- Formation: 1990; 36 years ago
- Founders: Stewart Elgie; Greg McDade; Don Lidstone; Michael M'Conigle; John Rich; Don Rosenbloom; Rick Sutherland; Andrew Thompson; Joan Vance
- Type: NGO
- Legal status: charity
- Purpose: environmental law
- Headquarters: Vancouver, British Columbia
- Region served: Canada
- Key people: President and Chair Lori Williams; Vice Chair Anna Reid; Treasurer Ian Burgess; Secretary Will Roush
- Website: www.ecojustice.ca
- Formerly called: Sierra Legal Defence Fund

Ecojustice Canada (formerly Sierra Legal Defence Fund prior to September 2007), is a Canadian non-profit environmental law organization that provides funding to lawyers to use litigation to defend and protect the environment. Ecojustice is Canada's largest environmental law charity.

== Background ==
In 1990 the Sierra Legal Defence Fund was incorporated as a charity. Founding board members included Stewart Elgie, Don Lidstone, Dr. Michael M'Conigle, John Rich, Don Rosenbloom, Rick Sutherland, Dr. Andrew Thompson, and Joan Vance and Greg McDade, a lawyer, was the executive director. Stewart Elgie worked in Alaska as an environmental lawyer where he was involved in the litigation following the March 24, 1989, Exxon Valdez oil spill in Prince William Sound, Alaska, which was the "worst oil spill in U.S. waters" until BP's 2010 Deepwater Horizon oil spill. The next year, when Elgie returned to Canada, he founded Ecojustice. Lidstone served as Sierra Legal Defence Fund/EcoJustice founding director from 1990 to 1999. Michael M'Gonigle was chairman of the board of Greenpeace Canada, co-founder of Greenpeace International, law professor and member of the Broadbent Institute.

== Clients ==
Clients have included Greenpeace, the Pembina Institute, Sierra Club of Canada, Living Oceans Society, Environmental Defence Canada, Canadian Association of Physicians for the Environment (CAPE), Raincoast Conservation Foundation, Prairie Acid Rain Coalition, and Toxics Watch Society. They represented Stephen Lewis, who was the chair of 1988 World Conference on the Changing Atmosphere which was held in Toronto; York University's Tzeporah Berman; Dalhousie University's atmospheric scientist, Thomas Duck; University of Alberta's Killam Memorial professor David Schindler (now deceased); and the United Nations Intergovernmental Panel on Climate Change (IPCC) lead Danny Harvey.

== Cases ==
=== Kearl Oil Sands Project ===
On February 27, 2007, a joint provincial-federal regulatory panel, which consisted of the Alberta Energy and Utilities Board and the Canadian Environmental Assessment Agency (CEAA), gave their approval for Imperial Oil's "massive" $8 billion Kearl Oil Sands (KOS) Project, which would create four open-pit mines north of Fort McMurray, Alberta. Based on the joint panel's "positive environmental assessment", the Department of Fisheries and Oceans (DFO) also authorized a "key water permit" for the KOS site. In the spring of 2007, Ecojustice (then Sierra Legal) launched legal action on behalf of a "coalition of environmental groups"—"Sierra Club of Canada, Pembina Institute, Prairie Acid Rain Coalition and Toxics Watch Society"—in Canada's Federal Court to overturn the regulatory approval, saying that "the project would destroy huge tracts of boreal forest and muskeg in the province's northern regions." The Pembina Institute's Simon Dyer said that the "joint panel has rubber-stamped another oil sands mega-project in the absence of clear answers about how to restore wetlands, rehabilitate toxic tailings ponds, protect migratory bird populations, or address escalating greenhouse gas pollution." In early March, when a federal judge ruled that the "federal-provincial assessment panel approved the Kearl development without adequately explaining its rationale," the DFO revoked the KOS water permit. Imperial challenged the decision in court but lost. The joint panel then submitted a "more detailed rationale" justifying its "conclusion that Kearl posed no serious environmental concern." The DFO then reinstated the water permit and in June 2008 Imperial Oil was granted permission to begin the KOS project. Although the DFO gave Imperial a "dozen pages of conditions" including "provisions for sediment and erosion control, plans to avoid a net loss of wildlife and provisions to transfer fish affected by the dredging to other bodies of water", Dyer said they it would be "extremely disappointing" if this did not include provisions for adequate "greenhouse-gas mitigation". He said that, the "federal government missed a real opportunity to show they're serious about dealing with climate change" by not including provisions for adequate "greenhouse-gas mitigation", without which this project would be "contributing to a growing problem over the next 50 years".

=== Climate denial groups ===
In December 2015 Ecojustice filed an official complaint against the Calgary-based non-profit advocacy organization group—the Friends of Science (FoS), the International Climate Science Coalition, and the Heartland Institute—under the Competition Act with the Competition Bureau of Canada on behalf of Stephen Lewis, Tzeporah Berman Thomas Duck, David Schindler, Danny Harvey and two others, in which they called for a criminal investigation. The Advertising Standards Canada (now Ad Standards) had ruled the Friends of Science ads—which appeared prior to the 2015 United Nations Climate Change Conference (COP21) talks, held in Paris from November 30 to December 12—with messages of "overzealous" climate policies paid for by Canadian "taxpayers' money". By December, in spite of the ruling, FoS has placed billboards in major Canadian cities with messages such as "The sun is the main driver of climate change. Not you." According to Charles Hatt, an Ecojustice lawyer, "The Competition Act makes it an offence to knowingly or recklessly make a false or misleading representation for promotion of business interests. This is an attack on science." According to a December 8, 2015 article in Ecojustice's Now Magazine, FoS's funding sources were unknown. Although Talisman Energy had donated $175,000 to FoS in 2004 under Talisman's previous president, by 2015, the new president no longer shared FoS's views on climate change. The Competition Bureau notified Ecojustice lawyer Charles Hatt, in a June 29, 2017 letter, that the inquiry concerning "allegations that Friends of Science Society, International Climate Science Coalition and Heartland Institute made misleading representations regarding climate change on their respective websites and, in the case of Friends of Science Society, on billboards" had been discontinued.

=== Trans Mountain Pipeline ===
In 2017 Ecojustice, acting on behalf of their clients Raincoast Conservation Foundation and Living Oceans Society, won the court case that overturned the federal government's approval of the Canadian division of Kinder Morgan Energy Partners' $7.4-billion Trans Mountain Pipeline project, which resulted in the National Energy Board (NEB) being forced to "re-evaluate the projects marine shipping impacts". The successful lawsuit "halted construction on the expansion". On November 6, 2017, McDade sent a letter to Kinder Morgan seeking an apology to the "City of Burnaby and its professional staff" following accusations that Burnaby had stalled construction of the Canadian division of Kinder Morgan Energy Partners' Trans Mountain Pipeline project. McDade stated in his letter that Burnaby's "regulatory process has been applied in good faith, as the evidence will readily show in the motion before the NEB." Following a June 2019 re-approval of the Trans Mountain project by the federal Cabinet government, in July 2019, lawyers from Ecojustice filed a motion with the Federal Court of Appeal to challenge the Cabinet's decision.

=== Volkswagen emissions scandal ===
In June 2017, Ecojustice, on behalf of the Canadian advocacy group Environmental Defence Canada, asked Environment and Climate Change Canada (ECCC), Canada's environment ministry, to "instigate an inquiry" into Volkswagen's alleged illegal actions in regards to emissions. Environment Canada—now known as Environment and Climate Change Canada (ECCC)—had undertaken an investigation in September 2015 to verify that Volkswagen had installed "defeat devices" designed to bypass emission control tests in Canada. An agreement was reached on December 15, 2016. According to a September 16, 2018 article in the Vancouver Sun, since 2015, while United States, German and other national governments had fined Volkswagen "billions of dollars and sent some of its top executives to jail for breaking environmental laws", by the fall of 2018, the Canadian federal government had done nothing. The Canadian Association of Physicians for the Environment (CAPE) are also a client of Ecojustice on this case. On July 23, 2019 Ecojustice lawyers on behalf of Environmental Defence "applied for a judicial review to challenge the failure of the Minister of Environment and Climate Change to properly report progress on an investigation requested by EDC staff in July 2017 as required by Public Participation provisions in the Canadian Environmental Protection Act (CEPA)."

=== Ontario cancelled cap-and-trade ===
In September 2018, Ecojustice lawyers, in "partnership with the uOttawa-Ecojustice Environmental Law Clinic", filed a lawsuit against the Ontario provincial government on behalf of Greenpeace alleging that the "Ford government unlawfully failed to provide for public consultation on a regulation that ended Ontario's cap and trade program and on Bill 4, the Cap and Trade Cancellation Act, 2018, currently before the legislature."

=== Bill C-69 ===
In a May 14, 2019 CBC News article, Environmental Defence's Julia Levin and Ecojustice lawyer, Joshua Ginsberg, expressed concern that proposed amendments to Bill C-69 would favour industry over the environment.

=== Public Inquiry into Anti-Alberta Energy Campaigns ===
Alberta Premier Jason Kenney's one-year $2.5 million Public Inquiry into Anti-Alberta Energy Campaigns, which he announced on July 4, 2019, is led by a forensic accountant, Steve Allan, with a "mandate to investigate foreign-funded efforts". Kenney cited "the intrepid reporting of journalist Vivian Krause", who has spent ten years examining foreign funding of Canadian environmental non-profit organizations (ENGOs) when he made his announcement.

==== Ecojustice Canada Society v Alberta ====
In September 2019, Ecojustice issued a letter of warning of a potential legal challenge to commissioner Allan, asking for a response within 30 days.

Ecojustice is saying that changes must be made to the mandate of the Public Inquiry into Anti-Alberta Energy Campaigns. According to The Globe and Mail, "environmental and activist groups are mobilizing against the public inquiry". Ecojustice says the "inquiry is unlawful and possibly unconstitutional because of the language used in the mandate" given to commissioner Steve Allan. Ecojustice said the inquiry labels "environmental groups critical of oil and gas development as 'anti-Alberta.'"

On November 21, 2019, Ecojustice lawyer Devon Page filed the lawsuit Ecojustice Canada Society v Alberta in the Court of Queen's Bench of Alberta in Calgary. While the "factual premise" underlying the inquiry have been "seriously challenged several times", the lawsuit is the "first challenge to its legality". The Ecojustice "lawsuit also alleges that inquiry commissioner Steve Allan was a donor to the UCP leadership campaign of Doug Schweitzer, now Alberta’s justice minister, who appointed him to the job."

On November 26, 2020, Court of Queen's Bench Justice Karen Horner dismissed Ecojustice's application for an injunction to pause the Inquiry partly because of the "strong public interest in ensuring the orderly, uninterrupted, and timely progression of the Inquiry." (Note: The Ecojustice attorney was Barry Robinson, Doreen Mueller, Q.C. and Peter Bujis represented Alberta's Attorney General and David Wachowich represented J. Stephens Allan.) Judge Horner said that since the Inquiry was in its second phase at the end of November 2020, and that in that phase the Inquiry would be "contacting organizations of interest in order to solicit their response" and that by November 26, the Inquiry had not published any "finding of misconduct" on Ecojustice's part, there was therefore "no evidence that the Inquiry contains unfounded and untested allegations against Ecojustice" harmful to its reputation. Ecojustice CEO Devon Page said that they would continue to challenge Inquiry activities and "expose it for the sham that it is".

=== Orphan wells ===
In January 2019, the Supreme Court of Canada ruled in favour of the Alberta Energy Regulator and Orphan Well Association in a case filed against the Alberta oil and gas company Redwater Energy. Redwater had gone bankrupt in 2015, leaving behind orphaned oil and gas wells that "needed to be cleaned up and decommissioned". In 2018, Ecojustice had intervened in the Supreme Court hearing on who is responsible for cleaning up orphan wells after following a bankruptcy. On January 31, 2019, in the case of Redwater Energy, the Supreme Court of Canada ruled 5–2 overturning "two lower court decisions that said bankruptcy law has paramountcy over provincial environmental responsibilities". The Supreme Court of Canada "allowed an appeal brought by the AER and the OWA from the decision of the Alberta Court of Appeal in Orphan Well Association v Grant Thornton Limited (Redwater). The "case has been one of the most closely watched by the Canadian oil and gas industry in decades". Redwater lawyers said that it was not possible for the company to comply with both the federal and provincial legislation in regards to the Bankruptcy and Insolvency Act (BIA). The January 31 ruling means that "bankruptcy is not a licence to ignore environmental regulations, and there is no inherent conflict between federal bankruptcy laws and provincial environmental regulations."

== Partnerships ==
Ecojustice partnered with the University of Ottawa in the Ottawa-Ecojustice Environmental Law Clinic, which is a "problem-based educational learning course designed to help train the next generation of environmental law and policy leaders."

== See also ==
- Canadian Parks and Wilderness Society (CPAWS)
- Climate ethics
- Ecocide
- Environmental Dispute Resolution Fund
- Greenpeace
- Sierra Club Canada
- West Coast Environmental Law
