= Marie Corbett (judge) =

Canadian judge and author

The Honourable Marie Carmel Corbett Q.C.

Judge of the Ontario Court (General Division)
- In office 1990 – 1999

Judge of the County and District Court of York
- In office 1986 – 1990

Personal details
- Born: July 1943 Avondale, Newfoundland, Canada
- Education: B.A. McGill University; LL.B. University of Toronto
- Occupation: Judge, author, women’s rights advocate

Marie Carmel Corbett (born July 1943) is a retired Canadian judge and author. She served on the Ontario bench from 1986 to 1999, first on the County and District Court of York and, following court restructuring, on the Ontario Court (General Division), the predecessor of Superior Court of Justice. Corbett was the first woman to serve as president of the Canadian Environmental Law Association (CELA). After leaving the bench she published the memoir January: A Woman Judge’s Season of Disillusion (2016).

== Early life and education ==
Corbett was born in Avondale, near St. John’s, Newfoundland, in July 1943. Her father, one of the first Newfoundlanders to enlist in the Royal Canadian Navy, was killed in the Second World War the year she was born; her mother subsequently moved the family to Montreal so that her children could pursue higher education. Corbett earned a B.A. with first-class honours at McGill University in 1963 and completed an LL.B. at the University of Toronto Faculty of Law in 1968. She was called to the Ontario bar in 1970 and was appointed Queen’s Counsel in 1983.

== Career ==
Following her articles with lawyer and author Richard Rohmer Q.C., Corbett worked as a research assistant to the Ontario Law Reform Commission and, from 1974 to 1980, as counsel in the City of Toronto legal department. She then practised municipal, pension and labour law at the Toronto firm Corbett & Barton until her judicial appointment in 1986.

Beyond public policy and women’s advocacy, Corbett was active in public life. She served as president of CELA in 1973–74; vice-chair of the Ontario Pension Commission from 1982 to 1986; and the first chair of Ontario’s Environmental Assessment Advisory Committee between 1983 and 1986. A founding member of the first Ontario Status of Women Council, she chaired its justice committee and helped organise the province’s inaugural conference on family-law reforms for women.

On 6 September 1986, Corbett was appointed to the County and District Court of York. When Ontario merged its courts in 1990 she became a judge of the Ontario Court (General Division), where she presided over serious criminal and civil matters until her retirement on 8 February 1999.

After retirement, Corbett turned to writing and public speaking. Her memoir, January: A Woman Judge’s Season of Disillusion, chronicles a month in 1995 during which she balanced sexual-assault trials with caring for a terminally ill friend; reviewers called it “an intimate look into Canada’s criminal-justice system.”

== Awards and recognition ==
Corbett received the YWCA Women of Distinction Special Award in 1993 for her impact on women’s legal rights and jurisprudence.
