= HRAC =

- Herbicide Resistance Action Committee, sponsored by CropLife International
- Hráč, an album by Pavol Hammel
