= Pesticides in Canada =

The use of pesticides in Canada is regulated by the Pest Management Regulatory Agency, a division of Health Canada via the Pest Control Products Act . Pesticides are used predominantly by the agricultural sector. In 2016, 20% of reported pesticide sales were non-agricultural sector products (including forestry, aquaculture and assorted industrial uses), and just under 5% were domestic sector products.

== History ==
The importation and sale of pesticide products has been regulated in Canada since 1927, originally under the federal Act to Regulate the Sale and Inspection of Agricultural Economic Poisons. This Act was replaced in 1939 by the Pest Control Products Act (PCPA) and Regulations.

Up until the 1940s, pesticides were primarily organic or inorganic substances (such as sodium chlorate and sulphuric acid) derived from natural sources. However these natural products had drawbacks such as their high rates of application, lack of selectivity and high phytotoxicity. In the 1930s, a concern grew about the use of these pesticides; particularly against the use of arsenic insecticides that had resulted in deaths during the 1920s and 1930s. This growing concern and the discovery of newer more effective and inexpensive products such as DDT, BHC, aldrin, chlordane, parathion, captan and 2,4-D led to an increase in the use of synthetic pesticides in the 1940s.

Prior to the 1950s, most consumers and policy makers were not overly concerned or aware about the potential health and environmental risks associated with the use of pesticides. As research into pesticides continued government policies shifted to better address these potential risks. In 1954, the Pest Control Products Regulations were revised to require applicants to provide evidence of the safety as well as the efficacy of their products prior to its registration. In 1968, the PCPA was further revised so that its main focus shifted from efficacy to public safety.

From the 1970s to 1990s, researchers focused on developing products that required lower rates of application and that had a single mode of action allowing the use of pesticides to be more selective. This time period also saw the rise of resistance issues and management strategies such as integrated pest management (IPM) were introduced to combat this problem.

Prior to the creation of the Pest Management Regulatory Agency (PMRA) in 1995, the Pest Control Products Act was administered by the Department of Agriculture. In addition to the Department of Agriculture, other federal departments had key roles in the Canadian regulatory process of pesticides. The prevention of the contamination of the environment was regulated by the Department of Fisheries and Ocean and the Department of Environment, who focused on the effects of pesticides on fisheries and aquatic ecosystems and the effects on wildlife respectively. The Department of Health and Welfare concentrated on the effects pesticides had on human health, particularly the health of those involved in the manufacturing, handling and application of pesticides and the health of others who may have been exposed indirectly such as through residues on food. Other departments that played a regulatory role included the Department of Indian and Northern Affairs, regarding Arctic water pollution, and the Department of Transport, which regulated the transportation of dangerous goods.

The Canadian Association of Pesticide Control Officials (CAPCO) was responsible to facilitate the information flow between both the departments and levels of government to aid in the coordination of federal and provincial regulatory efforts. The committee was made up of representatives from each of the provinces and territories and the federal departments Agriculture Canada, Environment Canada, and Health and Welfare Canada.

The PMRA was created on April 1, 1995, as part of an ongoing government effort to reform the pesticide regulatory regime in Canada. Staff and resources were consolidated from several federal departments into a single branch under Health Canada. Subsequently, the administration of the Pest Control Products Act was transferred from the Minister of Agriculture and Agri-Food to the Minister of Health.

== Regulation ==
In Canada, pesticide regulation is under the shared authority of the federal, provincial, territorial governments as well as municipal entities. The use, manufacture, storage, distribution, application, sale, and labeling of pest control products is governed by various Acts, regulations, guidelines, directives and by-laws. Pesticides are carefully regulated in Canada through a program of pre-market scientific assessment, enforcement, education, and information dissemination. All levels of government work together to help protect Canadians and the environment from any risks posed by pesticides and to ensure that pest control products do what they claim to on the label.

=== Federal ===
The Pest Management Regulatory Agency (PMRA) is responsible for pesticide regulation in Canada. Their roles include administering the Pest Control Products Act and Regulations, registering pest control products, re-evaluating registered products and setting maximum residue limits under the Food and Drugs Act.

Prior to registration, all pest control products undergo a pre-market assessment to ensure the products are safe when used according to use directions. Applications also undergo efficacy assessments to ensure the products work. Once it is approved by PMRA, the product is registered and given a Pest Control Product (PCP) registration number which can be found on the product label. The pesticide is re-evaluated if it has been more than 15 years since the last major regulatory decision to ensure they meet the latest Canada's health and environmental standards. The PMRA applies science-based decision making to premarket and post market reviews. These reviews incorporate human health and environmental risk assessments, as well as value and product chemistry evaluations. The evaluations consist of a risk-based approach which assesses hazardous properties and possible exposure.

Health Canada is responsible to promote, monitor, and enforce pesticide compliance activities under the Pest Control Products Act (PCPA) and Regulations. Health Canada also responds to incidents, complaints and situations of non-compliance. Compliance officers are located across Canada and inspectors conduct regular, planned inspections to verify compliance of activities regulated under the PCPA. The National Pesticides Compliance Program (NPCP) is administered jointly by two branches of Health Canada, the Pest Management Regulatory Agency and the Regulatory Operations and Enforcement Branch (ROEB).

=== Provincial and Territorial ===
Provinces and territories may regulate the application, sale, storage of pest control products in their individual jurisdictions but only as long as the measures they adopt are consistent with any conditions, directions and limitations imposed under the PCPA or other federal legislation. These are regulated via a system of permits and licenses for business to sell products, for applicators to apply products (including mandatory training), and facilities to store products. Provinces and territories also carry out enforcement and compliance monitoring, and response to spills or accidents in cooperation with Health Canada's regional offices.

=== Municipal ===
Cities, towns, and municipalities can be given the power by provinces and territories to regulate how pesticides are used locally, including creating bylaws to restrict pesticide use. The 2001 Spraytech v Hudson case set the precedent in the Supreme Court of Canada as regards the enforcement of municipal by-laws against pesticides. The 2005 CropLife v Toronto case further cemented the law regarding municipal pesticide bans.

=== Cosmetic pesticide bans ===
The ban on cosmetic lawn pesticides started from municipalities regulating their use, which then spread across the province and onwards. The Quebec government was the first province to regulate the use and sale of cosmetic pesticides in April 2003, when it introduced the Quebec Pesticides Management Code. The code was phased in over the course of 3 years and by April 2006 the use and sale of lawn pesticides was banned province-wide. The Ontario provincial government promised on September 24, 2007, to also implement a province-wide ban on the cosmetic use of lawn pesticides, for protecting the public. Medical and environmental groups support such a ban. On April 22, 2008, the Provincial Government of Ontario announced an intention to prohibit, province-wide, the cosmetic use and sale of lawn and garden pesticides. The Ontario province-wide pesticide ban on lawn pesticides came into effect with the Ontario Cosmetic Pesticides Ban Act on Earth Day, April 22, 2009. Over 250 products are banned for sale and more than 95 pesticide ingredients are banned for cosmetic uses. The Ontario legislation would also echo Massachusetts law requiring pesticide manufacturers to reduce the toxins they use in production. New Brunswick and Prince Edward Island adopted legislation in 2009 and 2010 respectively, banning just one lawn pesticide - the herbicide 2,4-D. As of April 2015, seven provinces (Newfoundland and Labrador, Prince Edward Island, Nova Scotia, New Brunswick, Quebec, Ontario and Alberta) have legislation in place banning the use of some or all chemical pesticides for cosmetic use.

== Issues ==
=== Effects on biota ===
There is a concern that pesticides may negatively impact non-target species. In 1999 at Montague on Prince Edward Island, nine fish kills happened in one year: every fish, snake, and snail was killed in a river called Sutherland's Hole near potato farms from which herbicides, insecticides, and fungicides ran off after heavy rains. In the 2003 PEI State of the Environment Report reported an increasing trend towards the numbers of pesticide-related fish kills. The PEI Department of Fisheries, Aquaculture and Environment concluded that the fish kills were the result of heavy rainfall occurring shortly after spraying; contaminating water runs off fields into streams that were not adequately protected. In response the Government of PEI restricted the use of azinphos-methyl, an insecticide implicated in many of the fish kills. During that same time period, the Pest Management Regulatory Agency announced that all uses of this pesticide were to be phased out by the end of 2006. PEI also established agricultural buffer zone for watercourses under the Environmental Protection Act and increased the level of enforcement while substantially raising the fines for violations. By 2010, recent years showed a considerable decrease in fish kills.

A 1998 laboratory study conducted at Trent University showed that exposing tadpoles to endosulfan, an organochloride pesticide at levels that are likely to be found in habitats near fields sprayed with the chemical kills the tadpoles and causes behavioral and growth abnormalities.

== Opinion ==
On April 3, 2008, the Canadian Cancer Society released opinion poll results conducted by Ipsos Reid, which established that a clear majority of residents in the provinces of British Columbia and Saskatchewan want province-wide cosmetic lawn pesticide bans, and that the majority of respondents believe that cosmetic pesticides are a threat to their health.

A survey conducted Canada-wide by Ipsos Public Affairs in March 2017 found that respondents generally associated pesticides with negative connotations. Respondents were found to be most critical of pesticide use on food imported into Canada and on fruits and vegetables. Despite their negative outlook on pesticide use, most respondents felt that the Canadian government was doing a good job at regulating pesticide products. Furthermore, the majority of respondents agreed that pesticides are necessary and serve a purpose.

== Lobbying ==
The Canadian Association of Physicians for the Environment, a non-profitable organization dedicated to environmental issues especially as they relate to human health, have campaigned on the hazards of lawn pesticides.
