= Reducing Excessive Deadline Obligations Act of 2013 =

- Long title: To amend the Solid Waste Disposal Act relating to review of regulations under such Act and to amend the Comprehensive Environmental Response, Compensation, and Liability Act of 1980 relating to financial responsibility for classes of facilities.
- Announced in: the 113th United States Congress
- Sponsored by: Rep. Cory Gardner (R, CO-4)
- Number of co-sponsors: 0

Codification
- Acts affected: Comprehensive Environmental Response, Compensation, and Liability Act of 1980, Solid Waste Disposal Act
- U.S.C. sections affected: 42 U.S.C. § 9608, 42 U.S.C. § 6912, 42 U.S.C. § 9614
- Agencies affected: United States Congress, Executive Office of the President, United States Environmental Protection Agency

Legislative history
- Introduced in the House as H.R. 2279 by Rep. Cory Gardner (R, CO-4) on June 6, 2013; Committee consideration by United States House Committee on Energy and Commerce, United States House Committee on Transportation and Infrastructure, United States House Energy Subcommittee on Environment and Economy, United States House Transportation Subcommittee on Water Resources and Environment, United States House Energy Subcommittee on Environment and Economy

The Reducing Excessive Deadline Obligations Act of 2013 (H.R. 2279) is a bill that would change the frequency of reports from the United States Environmental Protection Agency (EPA) about solid waste regulations. Instead of being forced to automatically review the regulations every three years, the EPA would be able to review them on an as needed basis. It would also grant precedence to state financial requirements for hazardous substances over federal requirements. The bill was introduced on June 6, 2013, into the United States House of Representatives during the 113th United States Congress.

== Provisions of the bill ==
This summary is based largely on the summary provided by the Congressional Research Service, a public domain source.

The Reducing Excessive Deadline Obligations Act of 2013 would, in section 2, amend the Solid Waste Disposal Act to remove a requirement that the Administrator of the United States Environmental Protection Agency (EPA) review and revise regulations declared under such Act at least every three years.

In section 4, the bill would amend the Comprehensive Environmental Response, Compensation, and Liability Act of 1980 (CERCLA) to prohibit the President of the United States from declaring any financial responsibility requirement under such Act without first reporting on:

- each facility or class of facilities to be covered by such requirement;
- the development of such requirement, including why the facility or class proposed to be covered by such requirement presents the highest level of risk of injury and why they are not already covered by adequate financial responsibility requirements;
- financial responsibility requirements promulgated by state or other federal agencies for the facility or class to be covered by such proposed requirement;
- the exposure to the Hazardous Substances Superfund for response costs resulting from such proposed covered facilities; and
- the capacity of the financial and credit markets to provide instruments of financial responsibility necessary to meet such requirement.

The bill would require the President to update such report to reflect any revision of the facilities or classes of facilities to be covered by a financial responsibility requirement.

In section 5, the bill would require an owner or operator of a facility or vessel that has already established evidence of financial responsibility associated with the production, transportation, treatment, storage, or disposal of hazardous substances under state law or any other federal law to establish evidence of financial responsibility under CERCLA only if the President determines that, in the event of a non-permitted release of a hazardous substance that is not a federally permitted release or authorized by a state permit, the existing financial responsibility requirements will not be sufficient to cover likely response costs.

It would also require the President, if such a determination is made, to accept evidence of compliance with such other federal or state financial responsibility requirements in lieu of compliance with any portion of the financial responsibility requirements promulgated under such Act to which they correspond.

In section 6, the bill would require the owner or operator of each facility that has substances that are listed as United States Department of Homeland Security (DHS) Chemicals of Interest and that are flammables or explosives in amounts above the screening threshold to notify the state emergency response commission in the state in which the facility is located.

== Congressional Budget Office report ==
This summary is based largely on the summary provided by the Congressional Budget Office, as ordered reported by the House Committee on Energy and Commerce on June 19, 2013. This is a public domain source.

H.R. 2279 would amend laws concerning the Environmental Protection Agency's (EPA's) oversight of hazardous substances. The bill would authorize the EPA to review regulations related to solid waste disposal only when necessary instead of every three years as required under current law. The legislation also would remove a long-expired deadline, which the EPA has already met, regarding regulations for the owners and operators of certain types of facilities that produce, transport, treat, store, and dispose of hazardous substances. In addition, the bill would direct that any financial requirements established by the EPA for such owners and operators do not preempt state or other federal agency requirements.

The bill also would require the EPA to report to Congress any financial responsibility requirements it intends to establish under the Comprehensive Environmental Response, Compensation, and Liability Act. Finally, H.R. 2279 would require certain facilities holding flammable or explosive materials to report on those holdings to state and local officials.

Based on information from the EPA, the Congressional Budget Office (CBO) expects that removing the current requirement to review certain regulations every three years would reduce administrative costs. However, some of those savings in administrative expenses would be offset by spending on the new requirement to report to Congress any financial responsibility requirements. The CBO estimates that, on balance, implementing this legislation would not have a significant net impact on spending that is subject to appropriation over the 2014-2018 period. Enacting H.R. 2279 would not affect direct spending or revenues; therefore, pay-as-you-go procedures do not apply.

H.R. 2279 contains an intergovernmental and private-sector mandate as defined in the Unfunded Mandates Reform Act (UMRA). The bill would require some owners or operators of facilities that store flammable or explosive substances to provide information about the amount of such substances at the facility to state emergency response commissions. Because those owners and operators submit similar information to federal agencies, the CBO estimates that the cost to submit information to state commissions would be minimal. Consequently, the CBO estimates that the costs of the mandate would fall well below the annual thresholds established in the UMRA for intergovernmental and private-sector mandates ($75 million and $150 million in 2013, respectively, adjusted annually for inflation).

== Procedural history ==
The Reducing Excessive Deadline Obligations Act of 2013 was introduced into the United States House of Representatives on June 6, 2013, by Rep. Cory Gardner (R, CO-4). It was referred to the United States House Committee on Energy and Commerce, United States House Energy Subcommittee on Environment and Economy, United States House Transportation Subcommittee on Water Resources and Environment, United States House Energy Subcommittee on Environment and Economy, and the United States House Committee on Transportation and Infrastructure. The bill passed the Subcommittee on Environment and Economy on June 6, 2013. It was reported (amended) by the Committee on Energy and Commerce on July 30, 2013, alongside House Report 113-179 Part 1. On January 3, 2014, House Majority Leader Eric Cantor announced that the bill would be on the schedule for the week of January 6, 2014.

== Debate and discussion ==
The United States Chamber of Commerce released a letter to the House of Representatives on July 30, 2013, announcing its support of H.R. 2279. The letter said that H.R. 2279, H.R. 2318, and H.R. 2226 "are well reasoned reform bills aimed at modernizing the Comprehensive Environmental, Response, Compensation and Liability Act (CERCLA) and the Resources Conservation and Recovery Act (RCRA)." According to the Chamber of Commerce, H.R. 2279 would remove "two impractical and unnecessary deadlines" and "ensure that existing state or federal financial assurance requirements are not preempted by requiring a report to Congress outlining the classes of facilities for which EPA intends to issue financial responsibility requirements, the need for such requirements, and a description of existing state and federal requirements that may already cover each class of facilities." It "strongly urges" Representatives to vote in favor of the bill.

In testimony before the Subcommittee on Environment and Economy, the EPA's Office of Solid Waste and Emergency Response stated that the EPA had complied with the existing three year reporting deadline and expressed a commitment "to working with the states as we evaluate approaches for addressing financial responsibility. The EPA stated that the removal of the 3 year reporting deadline "could potentially reduce a regulatory burden on EPA."

The non-profit organization Earthjustice opposed the bill. They argued that the bill "eliminates a basis for a lawsuit where public interest and industry plaintiffs are seeking regulatory certainty and a reasonable timeline for the EPA to establish coal ash safeguards." They also accused the bill of "weaken[ing] Superfund" and creating various financial barriers. The legislative director Andrea Delgado said that "the only thing these bills are concerned about protecting is the polluter’s ability to get away with poisoning communities and leaving their mess behind for someone else to clean up."

A coalition of 64 environmental and other interest groups (on both the state and national level) joined to write a letter to the chairman and Ranking Member of the Subcommittee on Environment and the Economy expressing their opposition to this bill and two others. The groups contend that the bill would "remove critical federal protections for communities impacted by the use and disposal of hazardous and solid wastes."

== See also ==
- List of bills in the 113th United States Congress
- Solid waste policy in the United States
- Resource Conservation and Recovery Act
