= CropLife International =

Agrochemical company trade association

CropLife International A.I.S.B.L.
- Formation: July 7, 2001; 25 years ago CropLife November 1996 GPFC 1967 GIFAP
- Type: Trade association, International association without lucrative purpose (AISBL), Nonprofit organization
- Headquarters: Brussels, Belgium
- President & CEO: Emily Rees
- Staff: 20 (2018)
- Website: croplife.org

CropLife International is an international trade association of agrochemical companies founded in 2001. It was previously known as Global Crop Protection Federation and started out as International Group of National Associations of Manufacturers of Agrochemical Products in 1967. Its members include the world's largest agricultural biotechnology and agricultural pesticide businesses namely BASF, Bayer CropScience, Corteva, FMC Corp., Sumitomo Chemical and Syngenta. The international body combines several national-level or continent-wide organisations, each one having the same goals but differing according to local language and custom.

== History ==
In 1967, the International Group of National Associations of Manufacturers of Agrochemical Products (from French: Groupement International des Associations Nationales de Fabricants de Produits Agrochimiques, GIFAP) was founded.

In November 1996, GIFAP was renamed to Global Crop Protection Federation (GCPF).

On 7 November 2001, GCPF was renamed to CropLife International.

On 2 November 2001, the CROP PROTECTION INSTITUTE OF CANADA morphed into the CropLife Canada entity. In a May 2005 defeat for CropLife Canada, the Court of Appeal for Ontario affirmed the Spraytech v Hudson decision and cemented the power of Canadian municipalities to pass by-laws controlling the use of pesticides within their boundaries.

== Structure ==
As of 2023 CropLife International comprises the following six companies: BASF, Bayer CropScience, Corteva, FMC Corp., Sumitomo Chemical and Syngenta. It also has 13 member associations: CropLife Brazil, PROCCYT, ArgenBio, CIB Japan, CropLife Africa Middle East, CropLife America, Biotechnology Innovation Organization, CropLife Asia, CropLife Canada, CropLife Latin America, CropLife Europe and Japan Crop Protection Association. At least one of the "member associations" is actually a not-for-profit corporation, thus giving it legal personality.

CropLife International addresses issues related to crop protection (i.e., pesticides) and plant biotechnology and is part of a global network of crop protection and plant biotechnology associations.

CropLife International works with regional and national biotech associations in more than 40 countries around the world. The CropLife International website says the organization is "the voice and leading advocate for the plant science industry, championing the role of agricultural innovations in crop protection and plant biotechnology to support and advance sustainable agriculture."

CropLife is the parent organization of the Resistance Action Committees:

- Fungicide Resistance Action Committee
- Herbicide Resistance Action Committee
- Insecticide Resistance Action Committee
- Rodenticide Resistance Action Committee

== Activities ==
=== Accredited stakeholder ===
CropLife has been engaging as an accredited stakeholder to the United Nations, OECD, European Food Safety Authority, the European Chemicals Agency and others.
