= Wood-waste burner =

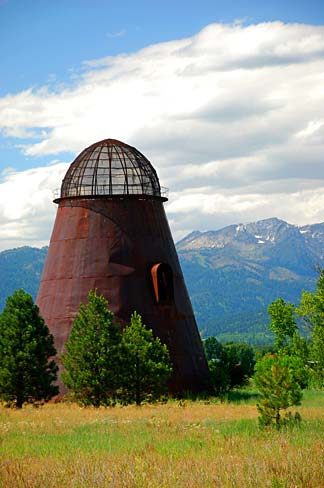
Derelict wood burner, near La Pine, Oregon

A wood-waste burner, or wood burner, known as a teepee burner or wigwam burner in the United States and a beehive burner in Canada, is a free-standing structure designed to burn waste wood from logging yards and sawdust from sawmills. Waste burners were originally cylindrical, and designs varied over time, but most surviving examples are of the conical type, and thus named for their resemblance to beehives, teepees, or wigwams. Burners have an opening at the top that is covered with a steel grill or mesh to keep sparks and glowing embers from escaping. Sawdust and wood scraps are delivered to an opening near the top of the cone by a conveyor belt or Archimedes' screw, where they fall onto the fire near the center of the structure.

Wood burners vent smoke and ash into the atmosphere without filtering, causing air pollution. Teepee burners went out of general use in the United States by the 1970s, and are prohibited from operation in Oregon and southwestern Washington state. A few derelict beehive burners survive in California, Oregon, Washington, and Western Canada. Most wood waste is now recycled for use in various forest products, such as pellet fuel, particle board, and mulch.

== History ==
=== Origins ===
Industrial forestry in the Pacific Northwest began in 1827, when John McLoughlin built the first sawmill outside Fort Vancouver. By the end of the century, steam power and improved saw blades had rendered mills extremely productive. That also meant they generated substantial quantities of waste, in the form of sawdust, bark, offcuts, and many other wasted parts of a tree. The conversion efficiency of the volume of a whole tree into usable products, even including non-lumber uses like turpentine or in later years particle board, was never very high. Even in the 1950s, it averaged 30 to 40%. Large amounts of waste would pile up at a mill, posing a serious fire hazard.

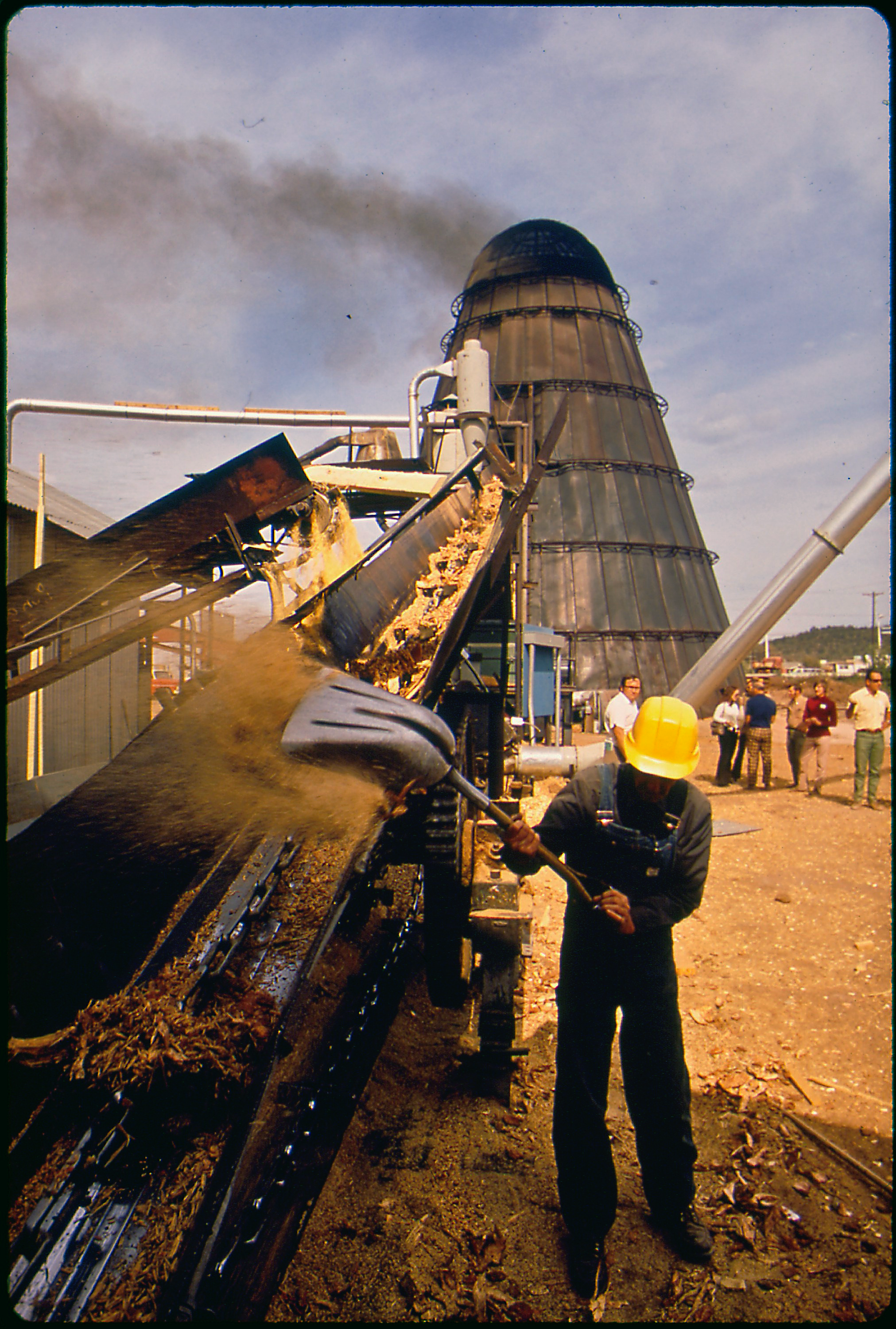
Loading the burner conveyor belt at the Kaibab lumber company in Payson, Arizona, 1972

Sawmills came up with varying ways to deal with waste, such as sending it down rivers, spreading it on empty land, or burning it in open pits. One of the disadvantages of open-pit burning was the uncontrolled release of sparks.

The Muskegon Boiler Works patented the first purpose-built wood waste burner in 1888. Competitors quickly began building similar designs. Muskegon Boilers invented a water-cooled wood burner in 1908, which reduced the needed thickness of the inner refractory layer, and could be a source of preheated water for use in steam generation. The Colby Engineering company of Portland invented an air-cooled version in 1916, which used a conical shape to keep the flames away from the shell of the burner, thus eliminating the need for a refractory layer.

The Seattle Boiler works iterated on the conical design in 1917 by removing the need for a foundation, instead using evenly spaced ribs with individual foundation footers. Air was introduced through dampers at the base of the cone. Although the design was patented by Frank Hopkins, owner of the boiler works, his invention turned out to be so simple that mill owners could build them without needing specialized boiler makers to fabricate them. Thus, the use of wood burners greatly increased. By the 1930s, most mills had adopted the conical burner.

Further advances in technology were achieved without patents. A key discovery was that a vortex could be created in the chamber to spin burning embers if air was introduced tangentially to the cone, thereby improving the completeness of combustion.

During World War II, there were concerns that Japanese bomber pilots might use the brightly lit burners as navigation aids. Mill owners were hesitant to subject the mills to blackouts, as dousing piles of burning sawdust with water made them difficult to restart. Compromise solutions included installing sprinklers to be used during an air raid.

=== Post-war innovations and decline ===
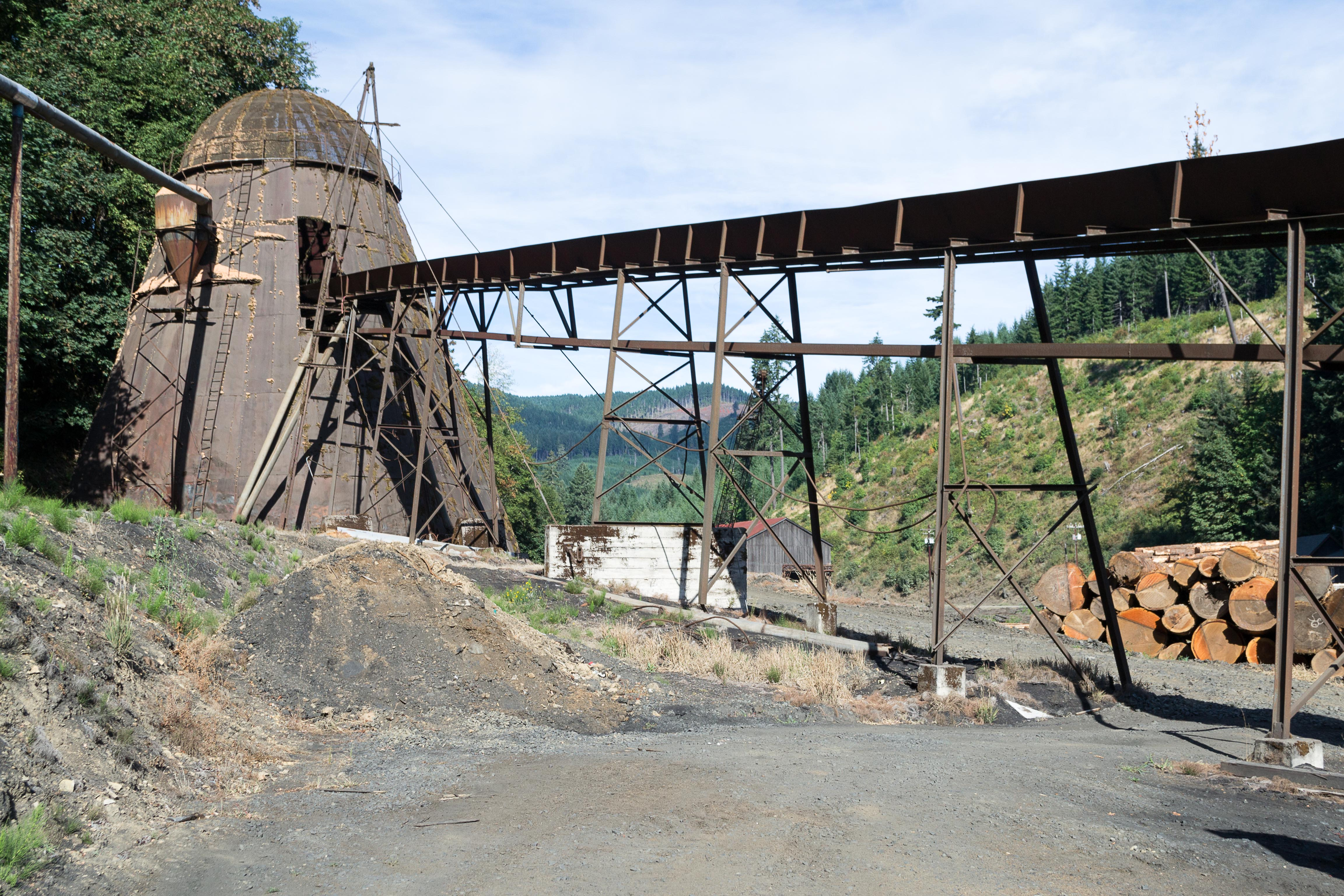
At the Hull Oakes Lumber Company in Dawson, Oregon

After the war, small mills built burners from scrap materiel, such as tanks with conveyor belts welded to them. But burning declined as more effective uses for wood were invented, and concerns over pollution grew.

In 1967, the Oregon Legislature directed the Forest Research Laboratory at Oregon State University to research a cleaner air-cooled wood burner. Researchers determined that smoke could be kept at a minimum if wood was burned at 800 °F (427 °C), and the addition of oxygen was carefully controlled by fans. But such retrofits were expensive.

The 1970 revision to the Clean Air Act curtailed the use of burners, but did not end it. Many mills implemented retrofits to reduce pollution. Others attempted to find other uses for their wood waste. The invention of particle board, and many other processes for more efficiently using wood waste, decreased waste output. Wood waste began to be used to make charcoal briquettes, barkdust, and for paper and pulp. However, the transport of waste to external processing locations proved difficult during the 1970s oil shock, as trucking was expensive.

The olivine burner was invented in the 1970s in an attempt to further reduce pollution. Contrary to the air cooled, thin shelled versions that predominated after World War I, the olivine burner opted for a thick refractory layer of olivine in a cylindrical shape that could consistently burn at temperatures over 1,500 °F (820 °C). Olivine burners were very efficient, but much more expensive than the traditional thin shelled steel versions; they were thus not widely adopted.

A burner in operation, lower right, at Georgia-Pacific's Waunna pulp mill in Clatskanie, Oregon, 1972

By the 1980s, the American forestry industry had largely abandoned wood burning, though it persisted in some smaller operations. By contrast, the Canadian forestry industry kept using wood burners. Canadian industry introduced the final innovation in wood burners with a "smokeless" thin shelled design featuring an adjustable four-way damper cap. That allowed for more efficient burning (at temperatures of up to 1,200 °F (649 °C)) while retaining an inexpensive thin shell. Canada phased out most of its wood burners in the 1990s. Author Daniel Mihalyo assesses that the decline of wood burners in North America was due to several factors. While clean air regulation and ecological preservation of sparse forest resources played a part, the invention of new ways to use wood was the nail in the coffin. The creation of engineered wood composites and secondary wood products gave considerable value to material that was previously so worthless it was only good for burning; thus wood burning was no longer economical. According to Mihalyo, the conversion efficiency of the volume of a whole tree into usable products was low for many decades, leaving some 60% of all timber harvested prior to 1980 to be "indiscriminately devoured" by wood burners.

Many wood burners were repurposed into other structures, such as hoppers for holding wood chips or sawdust. Several were turned into homes, including in Bonners Ferry, Idaho and Ravalli, Montana. In 2003, wigwam burner aficionado Curt Deatherage counted 131 still standing wigwam burners in the United States. By 2019, only 50 to 60 remained standing.

Despite the general end of wood burner use in North America, wood burners saw continued use in the developing world past the 1990s. Modern smokeless burning may be achieved with air curtain burners, which involve a refractory lined steel box that blows a laminar curtain of air over and into the burning material to recirculate and prevent the escape of smoke. Such burners are not generally used in sawmills however, and are mostly for in situ burning of forest products or waste.

== Construction ==
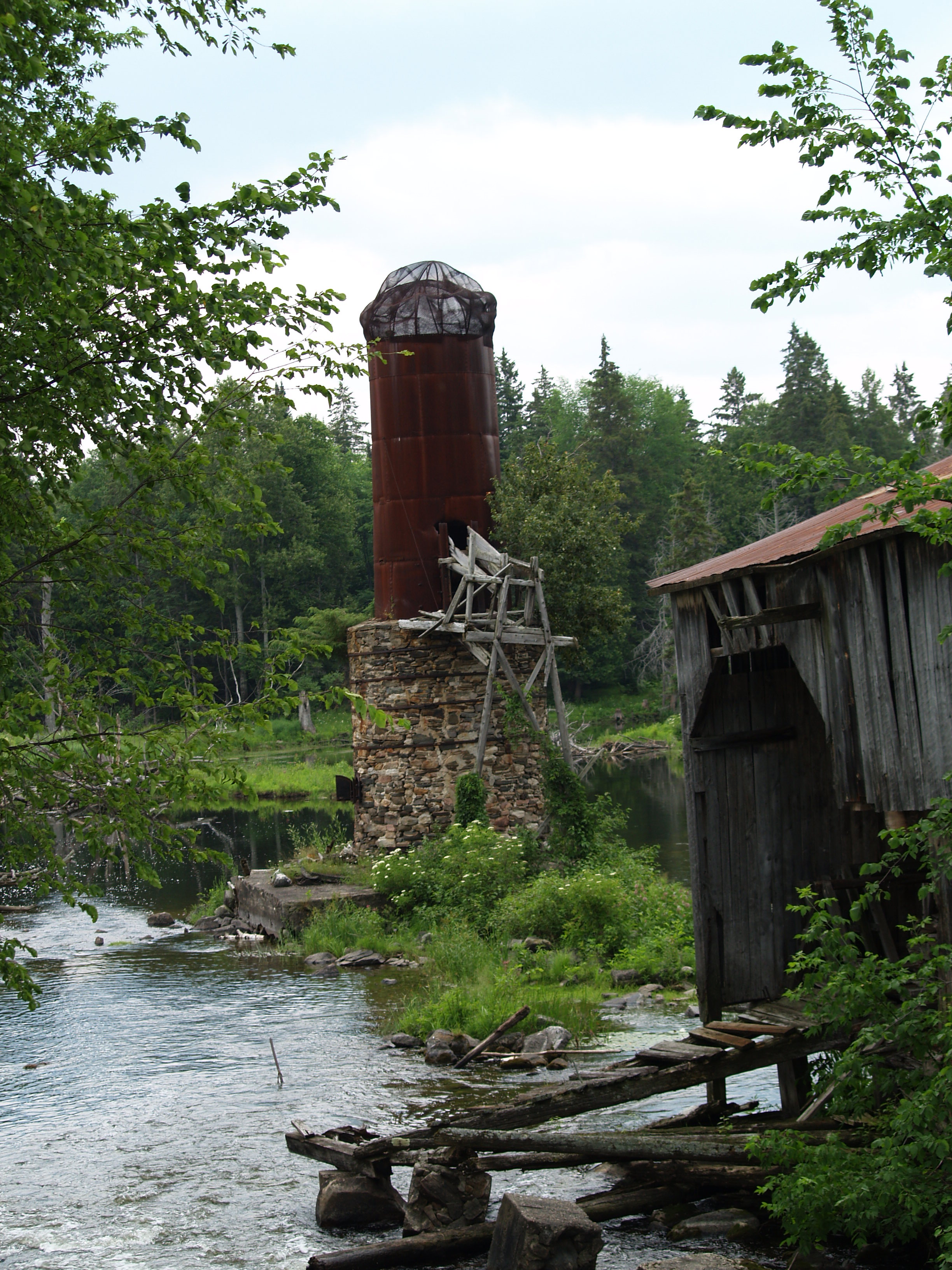
Old-style cylindrical design with full stone foundation in Balaclava, Ontario

Burners came in many shapes and sizes. The base of a burner was originally built on a concrete or stone foundation. The tall, cylindrical design invented by Muskegon Boilers prevailed until about 1920.Muskegon Boiler would prefabricate their burners in Michigan and ship them via rail.

Before the conical shape was introduced, burners were manufactured of thick plate steel, similar to that used in boilers. The inner layer was covered in a refractory material. Conical burners used merely thin steel cladding. Conical burners stayed cool by virtue of a natural draft, which drew in cool air from tunnels cut in the foundation of the burner. The tunnels also served as passageways to remove ash.

By the 1940s, there was a wide variation in burner types, but most followed two key rules. First, the diameter of the cap was half the diameter of the base. Second, the diameter of the base was equal to the height of the cone. That did not necessarily mean equal to the height of the structure, as there might be a cap on top of the cone to prevent the escape of embers, or chimneys on top of the cone. By that time, construction could be accomplished in less than a day with the help of a crane.

While some designs opted to not use spark arresting screens, in practice, most designs were not efficient enough in day-to-day operation to go without a screen. Especially by the 1980s, pressure to reduce smoke output meant that many operators were running their burners at temperatures in excess of their design, which placed excessive thermal stress on their steel shells. That led to increased deterioration and the development of many small holes and cracks in the shells, which may be noticeable on the inside of derelict burners as a result of the light they let in.

== Gallery ==
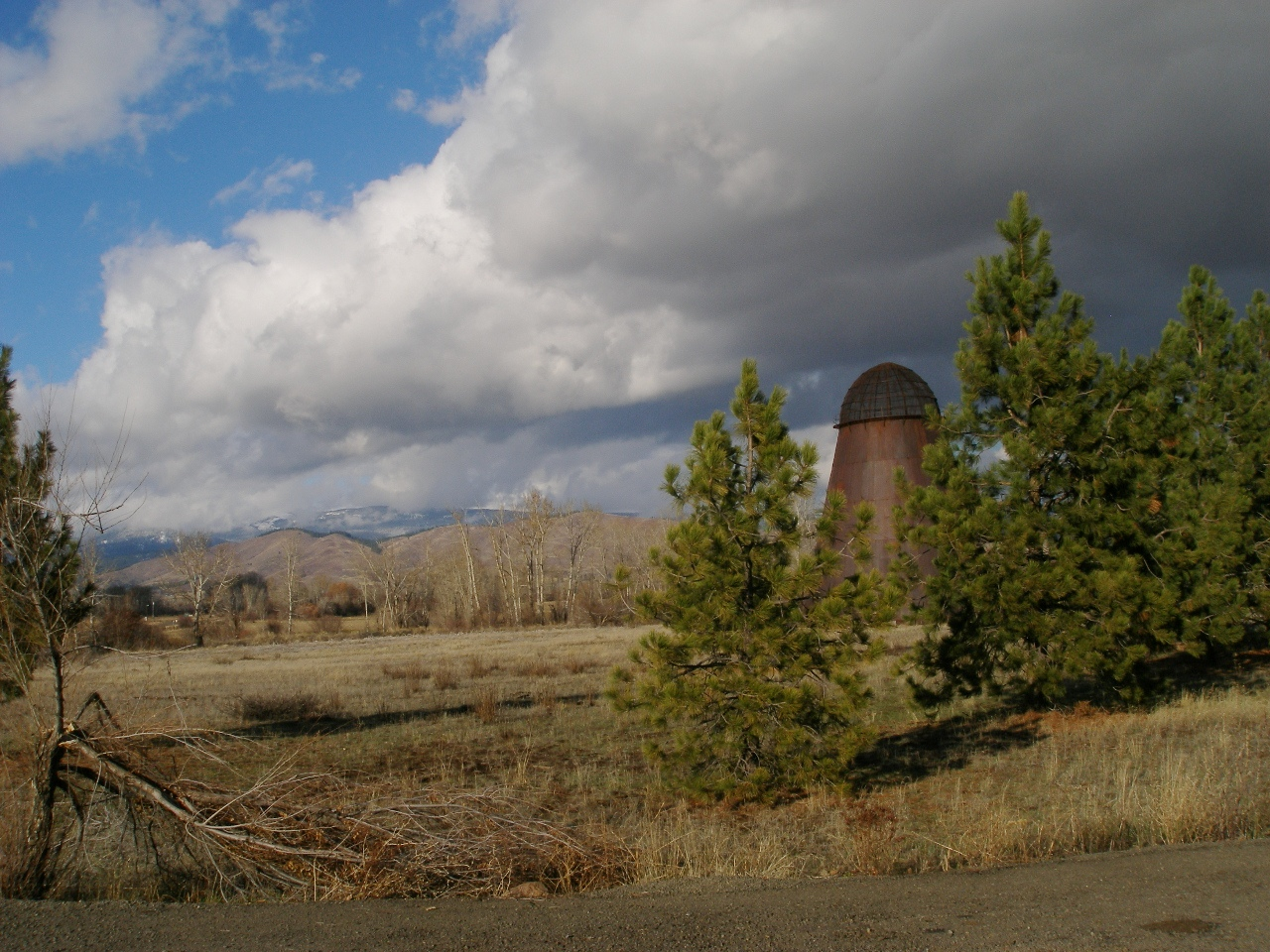
In Halfway, Oregon

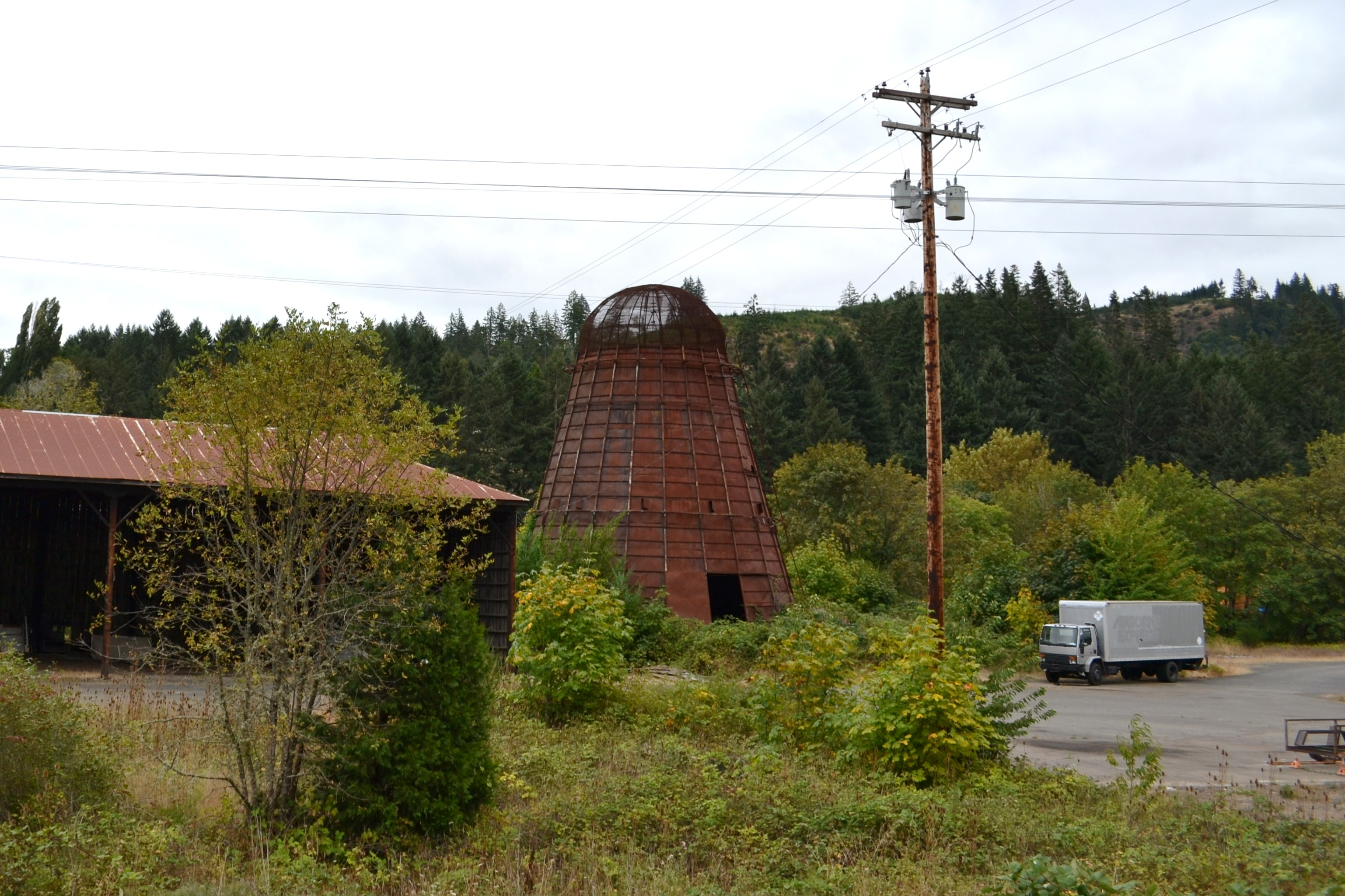
In Drain, Oregon

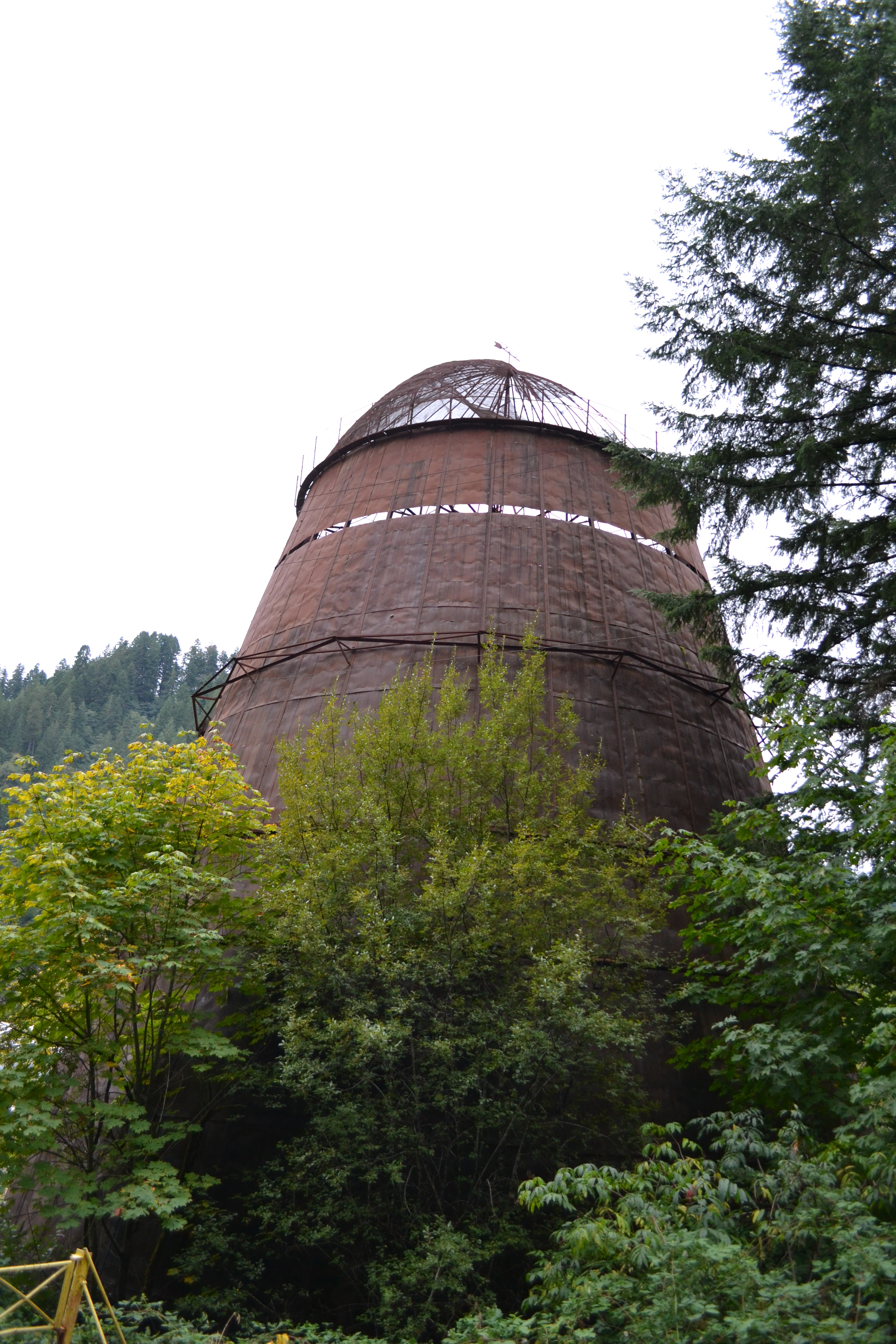
Near Swisshome, Oregon

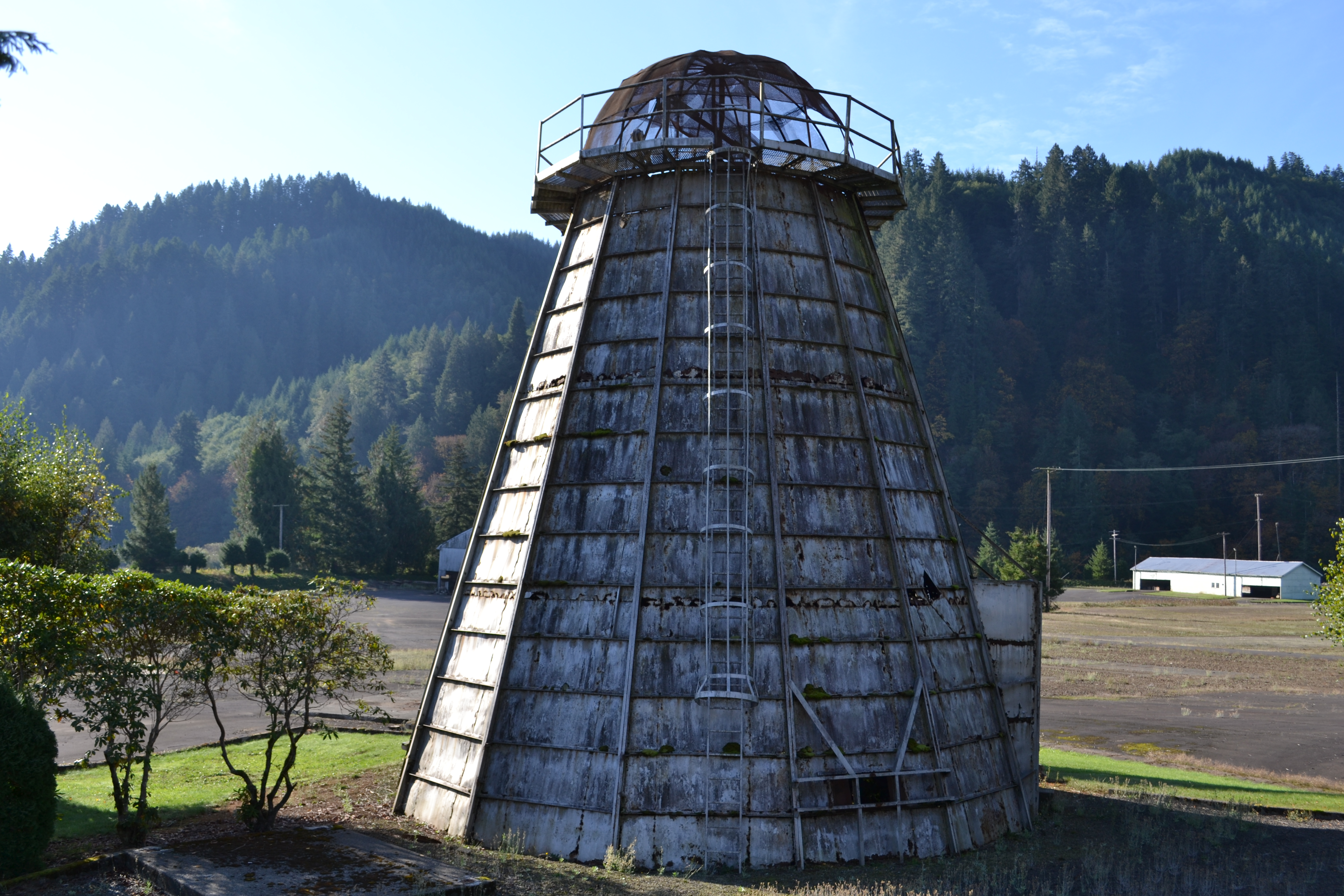
Compact design near Mapleton, Oregon

At a Louisiana-Pacific lumber plant in Post Falls, Idaho (May 1973)

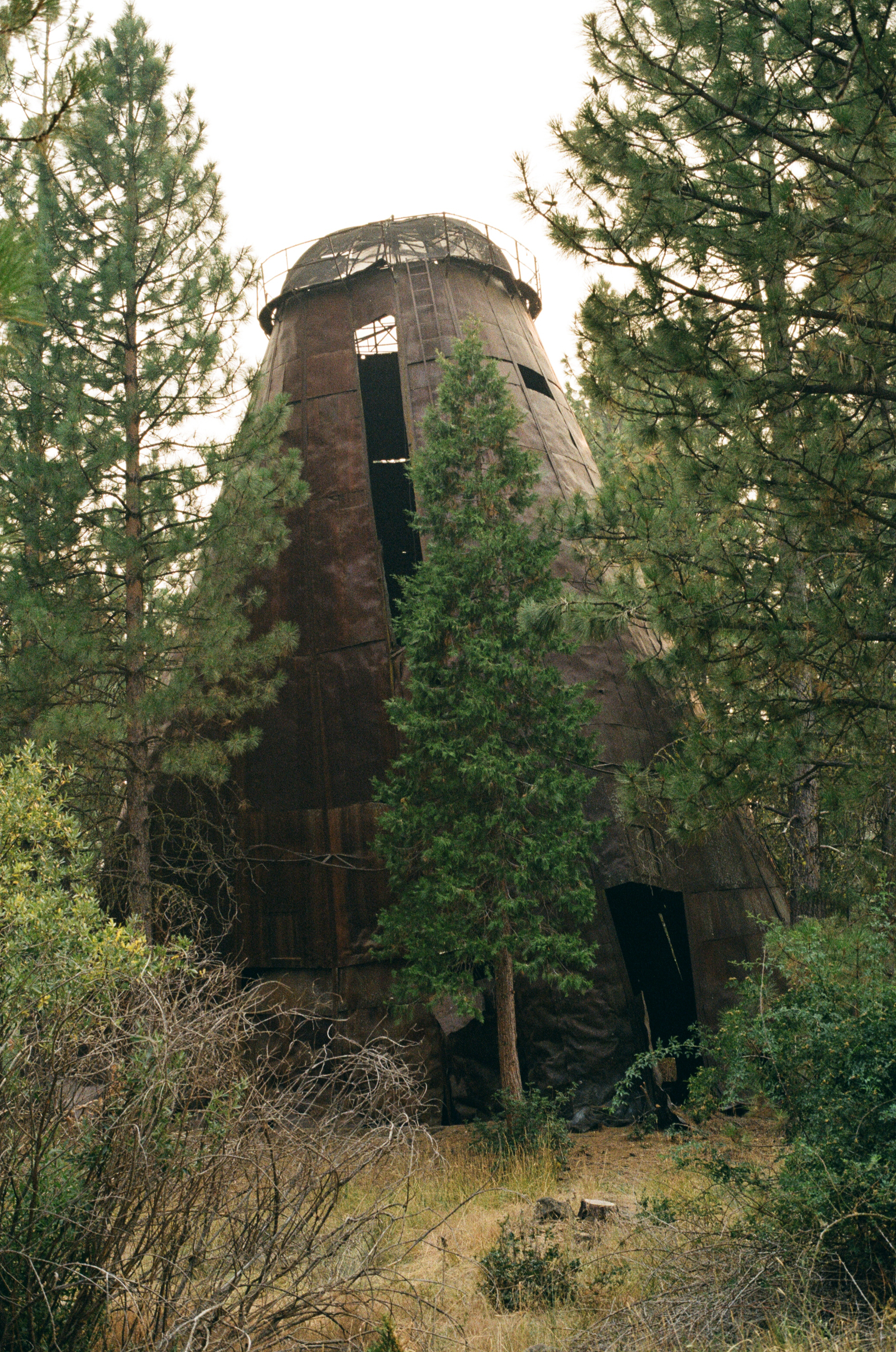
Remnant of a wigwam burner in Jackson County, Oregon (September 2021)

Garfield, Utah, 1972. Taken by the Environmental Protection Agency as part of a general efforts to document waste burners.

== See also ==
- Air pollution in British Columbia
- Clean Air Act of 1970
