= Canadian Association of Physicians for the Environment =

Canadian non-profit organization

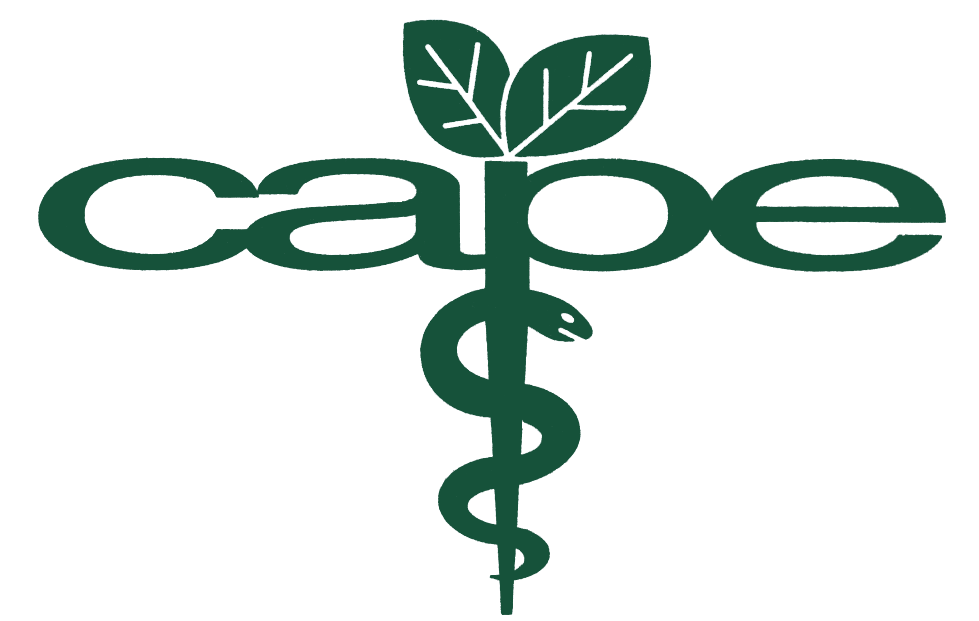
- Founded: 1994
- Location: Toronto, Ontario, Canada
- Website: cape.ca

The Canadian Association of Physicians for the Environment (CAPE) is a Canadian-based non-profit organization dedicated to environmental issues, especially as they relate to human health. The group was founded in 1994, and is composed of over 4,700 medical doctors and concerned citizens from across Canada. Its main focus is education of physicians and members of the public, sending delegates to scientific conferences, publishing opinion articles, talking to the media, and disseminating educational materials (including a video on the hazards of lawn pesticides). It also makes presentations to parliamentary committees.

== Mission ==
CAPE's current programme is focused on educating health professional on environmental issues, reducing pesticide use, "greening" hospitals and health clinics, and developing organic agriculture and gardening.

== Ongoing projects ==
There are ongoing projects regarding:

1. Children's health and how it is affected by the environment.
2. Toxins including: pesticides, persistent organic pollutants, metals, genetically modified organisms and endocrine disruptors
3. Greening health care
4. Climate change

== Accomplishments ==
The organisation is responsible for the publication of The Canadian Guide to Health and the Environment, (University of Alberta Press, 1999), a 322-page handbook that offers an overview of environmental health threats and how citizens can effectively respond to them.

They launched the Canadian Coalition for Green Health Care, a network of groups committed to reducing the environmental impact of the health care sector in 2000.

The group was a founding member of the Canadian Partnership for Children's Health and Environment in 2001, and initiated the "Changing the Environmental Impact of a Quebec CLSC" project in 2002. They provided expert testimony to the City of Toronto during its pesticide bylaw hearings. This contributed to the passing of pesticide restrictions in Toronto in 2003.

The group played an educational role in the passage of Peterborough's pesticide bylaw in 2005, named "the strongest pesticide bylaw in Canada" by the Canadian Environmental Law Association, and played a role in the education of legislators of the province of Ontario leading to the Ontario Pesticide Law in 2008.

== Awards ==
- Received a 2006 Canadian Environment Award (Gold) for cross-Canada pesticide education work. The Award was given by Canadian Geographic Magazine and the Government of Canada.
- Received a 2007 "Virtuoso Award" from the International Association of Business Communicators for creating a campaign to ban lawn pesticides in London, Ontario.
- Received a 2008 "Shared Interest Award" from Citizens Bank of Canada for general environmental protection work.
- Received a 2010 "J.R. Dymond Public Service Award" from Ontario Nature for playing a leadership role in the campaign to ban lawn and garden pesticides across Ontario.

== See also ==
- Pesticides in Canada
- Health effects of pesticides
