= Environmental Defence Canada =

Canadian environmental organization

Environmental Defence
- Founded: 1984; 42 years ago
- Type: Environmental organization
- Purpose: Environmentalism; Conservation; Ecology
- Location: Toronto, Canada
- Region served: Canada
- Method: Education, program delivery
- Key people: Suzanne Karajaberlian (Managing Director); Eric Stevenson (President and Chair)
- Revenue: C$3.8 million (2018)
- Website: environmentaldefence.ca

Environmental Defence (formerly known as the Canadian Environmental Defence Fund) is a Canadian environmental organization, founded in 1984. Its areas of education and research include toxic chemicals, urban sprawl, oil sands, global warming, water quality, and endangered species.

== History ==
The organization was founded in 1984.

Environmental Defence was part of the founding of the Green Energy Act Alliance. The Green Energy and Economy Act, a first for North America, went into law in Ontario in 2009, and outlined a strategy to improve conservation, increase renewable energy generation, and create green jobs. The Act formed part of the Ontario government's plan to put the province on a path towards reducing its greenhouse gas emissions, while becoming a leader in the emerging global renewable energy sector.

In its 2018 annual report, Environmental Defence stated that, during the year prior, it had raised over C$3.8 million.

== Areas of focus ==
Environmental Defence has a number of different areas of focus, including the following:

- Combating climate change, and creating jobs in the clean economy.
- Growing Ontario's Greenbelt, and developing functional, livable cities.
- Ensuring safe products are on Canadians' shelves.
- Informing the public about the dangerous chemicals in consumer products.
- Protecting safe, clean water.
- Creating a future free from plastic waste.
- Engaging young people in the future of environmental journalism.

== Studies ==
In 2008, Environmental Defence and The Workgroup for Safe Markets in the US commissioned a report, researched by a lab at the University of Missouri, which stated that plastic baby bottles from a number of manufacturers, including Avent, Evenflo, Dr. Brown's and Disney/First Years, were leaching unsafe levels of bisphenol A (BPA) when heated. This led to dozens of state and national environmental health organizations in Canada and the United States calling for an immediate moratorium on the use of BPA in baby bottles, and other food and beverage containers.

In 2017, Environmental Defence and the Natural Resources Defense Council (NRDC) released a report showing how tar sands mining operations in Alberta generated over 250 billion gallons of toxic tailings – a poisonous mixture of water, sand, silt, heavy metals, and other petrochemical waste products – have been stored in toxic lakes that cover an area greater than Manhattan and Boston combined. The NRDC noted that research by the Canadian federal government has determined that toxic tailings are seeping into groundwater and the Athabasca River. Environmental Defence and Daniel T’seleie of the K’ahsho Got’ine Dene First Nation requested the Commission for Environmental Cooperation (CEC) – the NAFTA environmental tribunal – to investigate whether the Canadian government was failing to enforce its Fisheries Act by allowing tar sands tailings to leak into Alberta water bodies.
