= Airshed =

Geographic area used to manage air quality

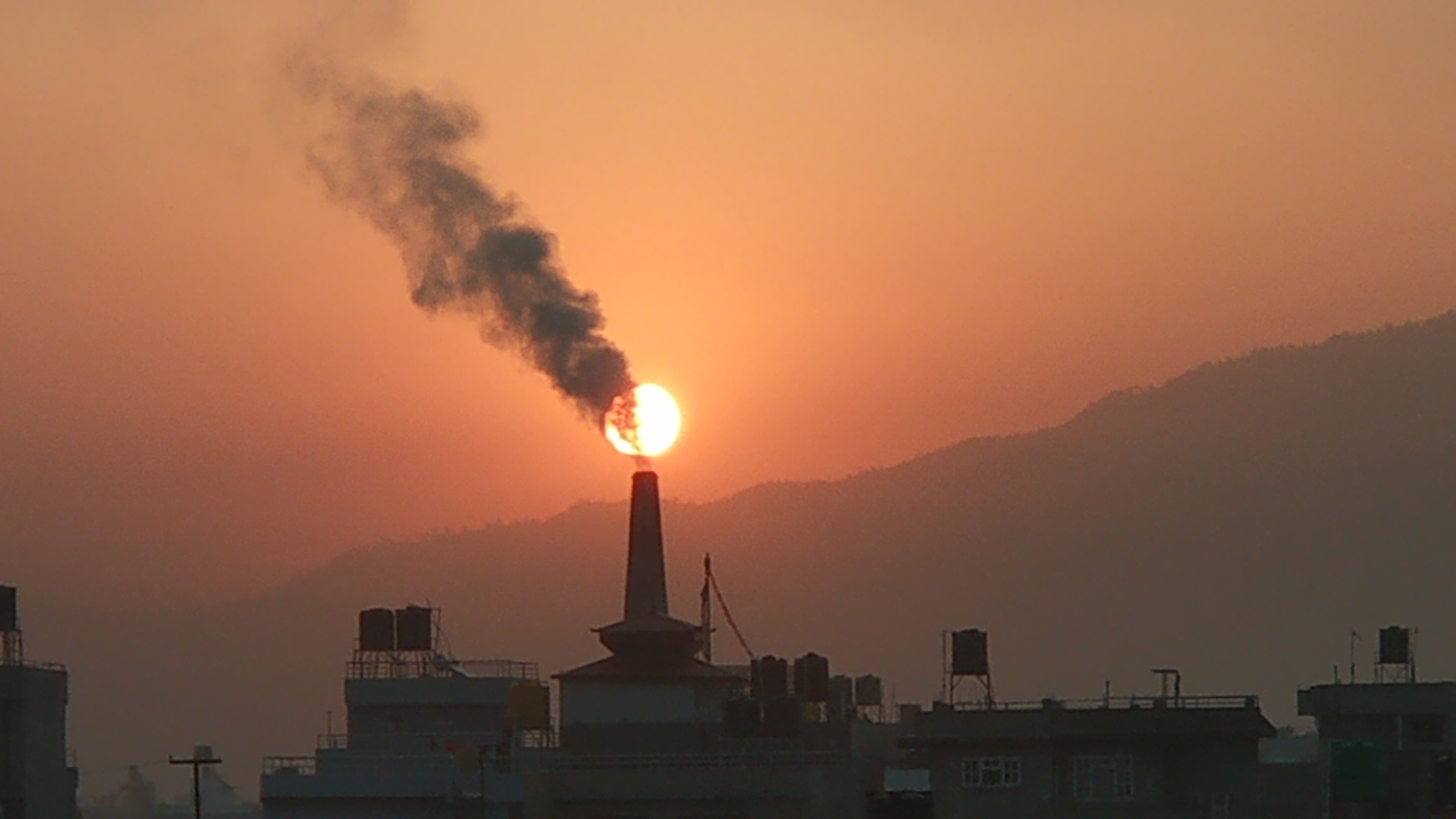
Air pollution from a factory in Nepal

An airshed is a geographical area where local topography and meteorology limit the dispersion of pollutants away from the area. They are formed by air masses moving across a landscape, thus influencing the atmospheric composition of that area. Their boundaries are loosely defined, but can be quantified. Airborne chemicals disperse throughout an airshed and enter bodies of water in the area.

== Defining airsheds ==
Airsheds are difficult to define precisely because they are spatially variable and can change over time. Their boundaries may change due to weather conditions and the sources of pollutants. Airsheds can be quantified for specific events, by season, or over a long period of time. Scientists model the movement of air masses over time to construct the dimensions of the upwind and downwind airsheds for a region.

== Urban Airshed Model (UAM) ==
The Urban Airshed Model (UAM) is a three-dimensional grid model that is used to simulate chemical and physical atmospheric processes. The United States Environmental Protection Agency uses this model to develop air quality plans for ozone in urban areas.

=== Uni-directional Impacts ===
The upwind airshed of a city represents the area where emissions and pollutants affecting that city originate. This includes compounds that form secondary pollutants such as fine particulate matter and ground level ozone. Downwind effects in airsheds are responsible for the spread of those pollutants outside of the city. The downwind airshed tends to affect a wider area than the upwind because they are a combination of the upwind airshed and pollutants produced within the city.
