= Canadian Environmental Law Association =

Canadian public interest organization

- Abbreviation: CELA
- Formation: 1970
- Type: Law Association
- Legal status: active
- Purpose: advocate and public voice, educator and network
- Headquarters: Toronto, Ontario
- Region served: Canada
- Official language: English; French
- Website: Canadian Environmental Law Association homepage

The Canadian Environmental Law Association (CELA) is a non-profit, public interest organization established in 1970 to use existing laws to protect the environment and to advocate environmental law reforms. It is also a free legal advisory clinic for the public, and will act at hearings and in courts on behalf of citizens or citizens' groups who are otherwise unable to afford legal assistance. Funded by Legal Aid Ontario, CELA is one of 79 community legal clinics located across Ontario, 15 of which offer services in specialized areas of the law. CELA also undertakes additional educational and law reform projects funded by government and private foundations.

CELA was established at the same time as its sister organization the Canadian Institute for Environmental Law and Policy (CIELAP), which does not offer Legal Aid services but focused on policy related to emerging and neglected environmental issues until 2011.

CELA's goals include holding governments and polluters legally accountable in cases of harm to the environment or public health, safeguarding citizens’ environmental rights, improving environmental equity, seeking policies that protect human or ecosystem health, and ensuring the timely cleanup of pollution.

CELA represents citizens and groups in tribunals, boards, and commissions and was especially active assisting the Concerned Citizens of Walkerton throughout all phases of the Walkerton Inquiry into tainted drinking water in 2002.

The current executive director of CELA is Theresa McClenaghan.

== See also ==
- Center for International Environmental Law (CIEL)
- West Coast Environmental Law
- Environmental Dispute Resolution Fund
