= Spraytech v Hudson =

114957 Canada Ltée (Spraytech, Société d'arrosage) v. Hudson (Town)
- Supreme Court of Canada

Hearing: December 7, 2000 Judgment: June 28, 2001
- Citations: [2001] 2 SCR 241, 2001 SCC 40
- Docket No.: 26937

Court membership
- Chief Justice: Beverley McLachlin; Puisne Justices: Claire L'Heureux-Dubé, Charles Gonthier, Frank Iacobucci, John C. Major, Michel Bastarache, Ian Binnie, Louise Arbour, Louis LeBel

Reasons given
- Majority: L’Heureux-Dubé, Gonthier, Bastarache and Arbour JJ.
- Concurrence: Iacobucci, Major and LeBel JJ.

Spraytech v Hudson, [2001] 2 S.C.R. 241; 2001 SCC 40 is a leading Supreme Court of Canada case on the general welfare powers of a municipality to regulate the conduct of businesses that impact the health and safety of residents.

== Summary ==
The applicants, a lawn-care company, sought to overturn a municipal ban on pesticide use. They contended that the ban contravened or otherwise interfered with Quebec's Pesticides Act and federal Pest Control Products Act legislation, and sought a declaration that the municipality was ultra vires its power. The Supreme Court ruled otherwise, as did the courts below. The appellants were taxed with costs.

== See also ==
- CropLife v Toronto
