= West Coast Environmental Law =

Canadian organization

- Abbreviation: WCEL
- Formation: 1974; 52 years ago
- Type: Legal Advocacy
- Legal status: active
- Purpose: advocate and public voice, educator and network
- Headquarters: Vancouver, British Columbia, Canada
- Region served: British Columbia
- Official language: English; French
- Website: West Coast Environmental Law

West Coast Environmental Law (WCEL) is an environmental law and public advocacy organization based in Vancouver, British Columbia, Canada that does reform for environmental policies in British Columbia and the rest of Canada.

West Coast Environmental Law specializes in policies for environmental sustainability, climate change, energy efficiency, sustainable forest and land use, aboriginal (First Nations) law, and environmental impact assessment. The organization also provides free legal advice regarding environmental issues, and provides grants through its Environmental Dispute Resolution Fund to individuals or groups seeking legal representation to resolve an environmental conflict.

== History ==
WCEL was founded in 1974 and is the oldest environmental law organization in British Columbia, Canada. In the late 1980s, WCEL played an active role in the establishment of Sierra Legal Defense Fund, now known as Ecojustice Canada, to use test litigation to protect the environment. WCEL later narrowed its focus to drafting and advancing legislative reform initiatives and providing public legal education. From 1990 to the present, WCEL has continued to collaborate with Ecojustice Canada on legal reform.

== Achievements ==
West Coast Environmental Law has played a role in several environmental legislative initiatives in Canada.

- Involved in developing the Canadian Environmental Assessment Act and the Canadian Environmental Protection Act.
- Represented the Peace Valley Environmental Association at hearings on the Site C dam.
- Worked as part of a delegation to help negotiate the Kyoto Protocol.
- Negotiated the amendments that resulted in the protection of the Great Bear Rainforest.
- Helped to draft the "good wood" wood and forest certification standard for British Columbia, which independently verifies that wood products come from forests that are traded and sold in an ecologically and socially responsible way.

== Legal aid ==
West Coast Environmental Law provides grants through its Environmental Dispute Resolution Fund to individuals or groups who need to hire legal representation to resolve an environmental problem. According to WCEL, the Environmental Dispute Resolution Fund is the only source of environmental legal aid in British Columbia and is used to hire lawyers at a legal aid rate.

From 1989 to 2009 the Environmental Dispute Resolution Fund provided $4 million in grants, which have aided in 500 legal cases in British Columbia. As an example of one legal case, marine biologist and fish farm activist Alexandra Morton used funding from West Coast Environmental Law to challenge the constitutionality of allowing fish farms in British Columbia. In another such case, a group of citizens known as Coal Watch used funding from West Coast Environmental Law to oppose a proposed coal mine located in Baynes Sound in Vancouver Island.

== See also ==
- Canadian Environmental Law Association
- Ecojustice Canada
- Environmental Dispute Resolution Fund
