= Center for International Environmental Law =

Not-for-profit environmental law firm

- Abbreviation: CIEL
- Established: 1989
- Type: Nonprofit NGO
- Tax ID no.: 52-1633220
- Headquarters: Washington, DC, United States
- President/CEO: Rebecca Brown (2025-present)
- Revenue: $10 mil (2024)
- Expenses: $8.8 mil (2024)
- Website: Official website

The Center for International Environmental Law (CIEL) is a public nonprofit environmental law organization based in Washington, DC, with an office in Geneva, Switzerland. It was founded in 1989. CIEL's team aims to use "the power of law to protect the environment, promote human rights, and ensure a just and sustainable society. CIEL seeks a world where the law reflects the interconnection between humans and the environment, respects the limits of the planet, protects the dignity and equality of each person, and encourages all of earth’s inhabitants to live in balance with each other." They help educate organizations, corporations, and the public on environmental issues and conduct their own research. Rebecca Brown has been the president and CEO since 2025. CIEL also offer legal internship programs.

== Issues ==
CIEL's work can be divided into three programs: Climate and Energy; Environmental Health; and Fossil Economy. Areas of interest include biodiversity, chemicals, plastics, climate change, human rights, environmental rights, international financial institutions, law and communities, plastic, and trade and sustainable development.

=== Research ===
CIEL has published several research reports and articles. Smoke and Fumes (2017) examined the oil and gas industry's efforts to fund the science and propaganda of climate denial, and has been cited in climate litigation against carbon majors. Plastic & Health (2019) and Plastic & Climate (2019) have been featured in publications that seek to explain the impact of the plastic crisis on health, climate, and the environment. In 2020, Pandemic Crisis, Systemic Decline examined the oil, gas, and petrochemical industry's attempts to use the COVID-19 pandemic for their own gain. In 2022, Pushing Back, a report about the petrochemical industry's development and what that means for communities, was published.
