= Environmental Dispute Resolution Fund =

Legal aid program based in Canada

The Environmental Dispute Resolution Fund (EDRF) is a legal aid program based in British Columbia, Canada, which provides grants to individuals, community groups, and environmental organizations who need to hire legal representation to assist them in resolving an environmental problem or dispute. The grants are provided and administered by West Coast Environmental Law, a non-profit environmental law and public advocacy organization based in Vancouver, British Columbia, Canada. EDRF funding allows grantees to hire lawyers (at a legal aid rate) from the private bar. Funding for the EDRF is provided by the Law Foundation of British Columbia.

The EDRF provides funding and grants for approved recipients to obtain legal advice to assist with their environmental disputes. The types of legal work funded include pursuing alternative dispute resolutions, appearing before government tribunals, participating in environmental assessments and challenging government decisions in court.

== History ==
The EDRF was established in 1989, by West Coast Environmental Law. Bill Andrews, the former Executive Director of West Coast Environmental Law, recalls:

[West Coast Environmental Law] discussed how we could expand our delivery of legal services, get out of Vancouver and meet regional needs … [and] expand the public interest environmental bar in British Columbia … It all came together with the idea of a fund that could pay for environmental help around the province (Bill Andrews).

== Notable achievements ==
Between 1989 and 2010, over $4 million was provided to recipients, helping to support and resolve more than 500 legal cases in British Columbia, Canada. In 2010, West Coast Environmental Law celebrated the 20-year anniversary of the EDRF. Notable EDRF achievements over the past 20 years include:

- (1992–1994) Negotiating parks for BC: When the BC government created the Commission on Resources and Environment to develop land-use plans on Vancouver Island and in the Kootenays and the Cariboo-Chilcotin, the environmental sectors were chronically underfunded. Support from the EDRF helped contribute to a process that saw 100,000 acres of land added to British Columbia’s protected areas every month for three years.
- (1994) No logging in Victoria’s Watershed: The Western Canada Wilderness Committee, with a grant from the EDRF, went to court to challenge commercial logging in the Victoria watershed and won.
- (1990–1995) Blocking the Kemano Completion Project: Alcan’s controversial power generation project, which would have adversely affected fish habitats on the Nechako River, saw defeat largely due to efforts by the Rivers Defense Coalition. Thanks to five years of EDRF grants, the Coalition represented by Andrew Thompson, a former West Coast Environmental Law Honorary Board member, in a court action and BC Utilities Commission hearings, Alcan's power generation project saw defeat.
- (1997–2000) Protecting the Pitt Polder: A large-scale golf resort would have opened the wetland and agricultural lands known as the Pitt Polder, in Pitt Meadows, to development. However, thanks to grants from the EDRF, the Pitt Polder Preservation Society was able to convince the British Columbia Court of Appeal to throw out bylaws that allowed for the development.
- (2001–2002) Marbled murrelets protected: The Sunshine Coast Conservation Association used EDRF funds to successfully challenge plans to log in the habitat of the endangered marbled murrelet.
- (2005) Parks for turtles, not developers: The West Kootenay Eco-Society successfully challenged the plans of the Minister of Parks to relocate Park roads in Grohman Narrows Provincial Park through the habitat of threatened painted turtles to accommodate a local developer.
- (2003–2008) Zero Waste Vancouver: EDRF funding to the Nlaka’pamux Nation Tribal Council and the local Cornwall Watershed Coalition was instrumental in derailing plans to turn the sensitive grasslands at Ashcroft Ranch into a landfill, and convincing Metro Vancouver to work towards zero waste.
- (2008–2009) Fish farm laws unconstitutional: Fish farm opponent and marine biologist Alexandra Morton, with EDRF funding, teamed up with a long-time environmental lawyer, Greg McDade, in a successful challenge to the constitutionality of British Columbia’s laws allowing fish farms in its waters, ruling that fish farms fall under federal jurisdiction.

== Summary ==
West Coast Environmental Law provides approximately $200,000 in EDRF grants each year to a number of different recipients from across British Columbia, Canada. Through the EDRF it helps individuals, environmental organizations and community organizations use the law to protect their environment.
