= Froth treatment (Athabasca oil sands) =

Process of bitumen treatment

Bitumen froth treatment is a process used in the Athabasca oil sands (AOS) bitumen recovery operations to remove fine inorganics—water and mineral particles—from bitumen froth, by diluting the bitumen with a light hydrocarbon solvent—either naphthenic or paraffinic—to reduce the viscosity of the froth and to remove contaminants that were not removed in previous water-based gravity recovery phases. Bitumen with a high viscosity or with too many contaminants, is not suitable for transporting through pipelines or refining. The original and conventional naphthenic froth treatment (NFT) uses a naphtha solvent with the addition of chemicals. Paraffinic Solvent Froth Treatment (PSFT), which was first used commercially in the Albian Sands in the early 2000s, results in a cleaner bitumen with lower levels of contaminates, such as water and mineral solids. Following froth treatments, bitumen can be further upgraded using "heat to produce synthetic crude oil by means of a coker unit."

== Background ==
Oil sand consists of a matrix of solid mineral material—quartz sand and clays, water, and the hydrocarbon, bitumen, which is the heaviest form of petroleum. According to the United Nations Institute for Training and Research, bitumen's normal viscosity is greater than 10 mPa·s and its density is greater than 1000 kg/m^{3}. Oil sands, before processing, comprise fine particles of silt and clay, that are 44 microns or less, and coarse particles of sand and rock, that are larger than 44 microns. Each grain of quartz sand, which is extremely abrasive and has an angular shapes, is "completely enveloped within bitumen". Each sand grain is surrounded by a thin film of water and bitumen covers the aqueous layer and the angular sand grain. The bitumen-and water-covered grains of quartz sand stick to one another. When untreated, the highly abrasive oil sands would damage pipelines, trucks, and all the equipment used in mining and operations. As well, the viscosity of bitumen changes with heat and cold. It is like molasses when warm, and will freeze when cold. Bitumen as a hydrocarbon, is considered to be a valuable energy resource. The more bitumen in an oil sands deposit, the more valuable it is. If a deposit contains less than 6% of bitumen it is not worth mining. The oil sands deposit has to have at least 18% of bitumen to be economically viable.

Bitumen production in 2004 included six inter-related and integrated processes or units—mining, utilities, extraction, froth treatment, water management, oil sands tailings ponds, and upgrading, according to a 2004 article in the Canadian Journal of Chemical Engineering (CJCE). The frothing treatment is part of an integrated process.

Due to its high viscosity, heavy oil is much more challenging to produce and transport. Viscosity—the "internal resistance to the flow of fluid", is a physical property of crude oil—and an important parameter in the development and design of ultimate oil recovery and effective fluid flow pipelines. Viscosity is one of the pressure–volume–temperature (PVT) properties that is estimated during the different stages of oil exploration, production, recovery, and transportation.

In bitumen, asphaltenes, which are often defined as the fraction which cannot be dissolved in n-heptane, impact negatively in oils sands operations—they "impart high viscosity to crude oils" and can cause a "myriad of production problems." Asphaltenes are molecular substances found in crude oil along with saturates—saturated hydrocarbons such as alkanes, aromatic hydrocarbons, and resins, known as (SARA).

The first stage of the extraction process, used by oil sands operators in commercial operations, is a modified Clark hot water extraction (CHWE) process which was developed by Karl Adolf Clark's (1888–1966) in the 1920s. According to a 2017 Oil Sands Magazine article, after bitumen froth has been separated using the first stage of the bitumen recovery process—water-based gravity separation—the solution contains on average "60% bitumen, 30% water and 10% fine solids." The gravity separation vessel—the Primary Separation Cell (PSC), Primary Separation Vessel (PSV) or the SepCell—recovers 90% of the bitumen. During this process bitumen froth is produced. The froth is highly aerated—full of air bubble—and requires deaeration before it can be pumped to a Froth Storage Tank.

The second stage is the froth treatment. The quality of bitumen froth prior to the frothing treatment—a solvent-based gravity separation treatment—is "too low to be processed by an upgrader or refinery." The water-based gravity separation alone cannot remove the remaining contaminants, which are 10 to 15% solids and up to 40% water.

Froth treatments use a light hydrocarbon to lower the viscosity of the bitumen, releasing the fine particles and water, resulting in a cleaner diluted bitumen stream.

The micrometer-sized inorganic mineral contaminants in the bitumen froth, after the first stage of processing, consist of fine silt and clay and the "water-in-oil emulsion droplets." These droplets, formed during the water-based bitumen extraction process, are the most challenging to remove.

These emulsified water droplets are further stabilized by the micro-sized particles of quartz sand. Water-in-oil emulsions are "easy to destabilize" when fine mineral particles are removed. During an effective froth treatment removal process, the fine—micro sized—mineral particles form larger aggregates which facilitates the destabilization of the emulsified water droplets.

During the integrated froth treatment, a light hydrocarbon—either a naphthenic or paraffinic solvent—is added to the froth to reduce the bitumen's viscosity and to remove the fine inorganic particles with a more "effective gravity separation".

A 2013, American Chemical Society (ACS) described bitumen froth treatment as an "integrated process step in the Athabasca oil sands bitumen recovery operations. Its objective is to separate mineral solids and water from the bitumen froth. The bitumen froth is diluted with naphthenic or paraffinic solvents to lower its viscosity to facilitate the separation. Bitumen froth treatment is the "removal of inorganics (mineral particles and water droplets) from a bitumen organic solvent solution."

The solvent to bitumen ratio (S/B) changes the dynamics of the water-in-diluted bitumen—dilbit—emulsions.

By 2006, there were two commercialized froth treatment processes in the province of Alberta. At that time, they were called the "Syncrude Process," which involved "dilution with an aromatic solvent followed by centrifugation" and the "Albian Process," which involved "dilution with a paraffinic solvent followed by gravity settling."

Following the frothing process, the bitumen may require more upgrading before it can be transported through pipelines. Processors that use the newer technology of Paraffinic Solvent Froth Treatment (PSFT), which has been in commercial use since 2002, no longer require this stage of upgrading, which represents a significant reduction in the cost of processing. The original—and more conventional—naphthenic froth treatment (NFT), does require an upgrader.

In order to produce a marketable synthetic crude oil from oil sands bitumen, the heavy oil can only be processed at special refineries that include a complex heavy oil upgrader with a coker unit. In Canada, the Co-op Refinery Complex in Regina, Saskatchewan, has a heavy oil upgrader section of the plant with the necessary Coker unit capable of processing the oil sands product, such as Lloydminster heavy oil, which is a component in the Western Canadian Select (WCS). (Note: Western Canadian Select (WCS), is one of the petroleum products from the Western Canadian Sedimentary Basin oil sands. WCS, which is a heavy blended crude oil, is composed mostly of bitumen that is blended with condensate diluents, and conventional, and unconventional oil. WCS was launched in 2004 by EnCana (now Cenovus), Canadian Natural Resources Limited, Petro-Canada (now Suncor) and Talisman Energy Inc. (now Repsol Oil & Gas Canada Inc.) became the benchmark for very heavy crude oil.) (Note: "US refineries import large quantities of crude oil from Canada, Mexico, Colombia and Venezuela, and they began in the 1990s to build coker and sulfur capacity enhancements to accommodate the growth of these medium and heavy sour crude oils while meeting environment requirements and consumer demand for transportation fuels. "While US refineries have made significant investments in complex refining hardware, which supports processing heavier, sourer crude into gasoline and distillates, similar investment outside the US has been pursued less aggressively. Medium and heavy crude oil make up 50% of US crude oil inputs and the US continues to expand its capacity to process heavy crude." By 2011 Large integrated oil companies that produce WCS in Canada have also started to invest in upgrading refineries in order to process WCS." See the article Western Canadian Select for additional references.)

=== Naphthenic Froth Treatment (NFT) ===
The original and conventional froth treatment uses a solvent naphtha with the addition of chemicals to destabilize the emulsion. For thirty years, from the 1970s to the early 2000s, the only technology available in the oils sands industry for bitumen recovery, was Naphthenic Froth Treatment (NFT).

In an article published in 2002 in the journal, Chemosphere, which has been cited over 100 times, the authors said that naphthenic acids are present in Athabasca oil sands (AOL) tailings pond water (TPW) at an estimated concentration of 81 mg/L., which is too low a level for TPW to be considered a viable source for commercial recovery. They studied a solvent-based laboratory bench procedure developed to "efficiently extract naphthenic acids from bulk volumes of Athabasca oil sands tailings pond water (TPW)." The same authors had published the oft-cited 2001 article in the Society of Toxicology's Toxicological Sciences, in which they stated that "naphthenic acids are the most significant environmental contaminants resulting from petroleum extraction from oil sands deposits." They found that "under worst-case exposure conditions, acute toxicity is unlikely in wild mammals exposed to naphthenic acids" in [Athabasca oil sands] (AOS) tailings pond water, "but repeated exposure may have adverse health effects."

=== Paraffinic froth treatment (PFT) ===
In 1990, the Paraffinic Solvent Froth Treatment (PSFT) was developed with research contributed by CanmetENERGY. Syncrude patented the process in 1994 and "made the use rights available to all members of an oil sands Froth Treatment consortium, allowing the process to be implemented at other oil sands operations."

PFT reduces the "viscosity of the bitumen, enabling water and solids removal by gravity separation". It also precipitates asphaltenes, which bind with water and solids" resulting in a cleaner bitumen that is "virtually free of impurities." This creates a cleaner bitumen with lower levels of aqueous and mineral contaminants.

In 2011 SNC Lavalin entered into a C$650-million contract to build a PSFT plant in the Athabaska oil sands region in 2012, the first in the Canadian oil sands industry.

The first commercialization of the Paraffinic Froth Treatment (PFT) was undertaken by the Athabasca Oil Sands Project (AOSP), in the Regional Municipality of Wood Buffalo in the early 2000s. AOSP, also known as Albian Sands—is a joint venture between Canadian Natural Resources (CNRL) (70%), Chevron Canada (20%), and Shell Canada (10%) AOSP consists of the Muskeg River Mine, Jack Pine Mine and the Scotford Upgrader. CNRL purchased Shell's shares in 2017.

PSFT technology is also in use at Imperial Oil's Kearl Oil Sands, and Teck Resources's Fort Hills open-pit oil sands mining operation. Teck plans on using it at its proposed massive Frontier open-pit oil sands mining operation. PSFT technology, which eliminates the use of an upgrader, has a "lower GHG intensity than about half of the oil currently refined in the U.S.", according to Teck.

By 2011, projected costs for Imperial Oil's Kearl "mega-mine" had increased to "C$10.9 billion from initial estimates of C$8 billion." Imperial cut costs by using the frothing technique " instead of building an upgrader to process raw bitumen."

There are a number of research projects on improving and evaluating innovations in froth treatment.

== Regulations ==
The industry-funded and provincial government mandated, Alberta Energy Regulator (AER) regulates bitumen mining in the province. The AER's Directive 082: Operating Criteria - Resource Recovery Requirements for Oil Sands Mine and Processing Plants sets minimum recovery rates for all oil sands operations in the province. Oils sands deposits have varying ore grades with some having higher bitumen content than others.
