= Tailings dam =

Type of dam

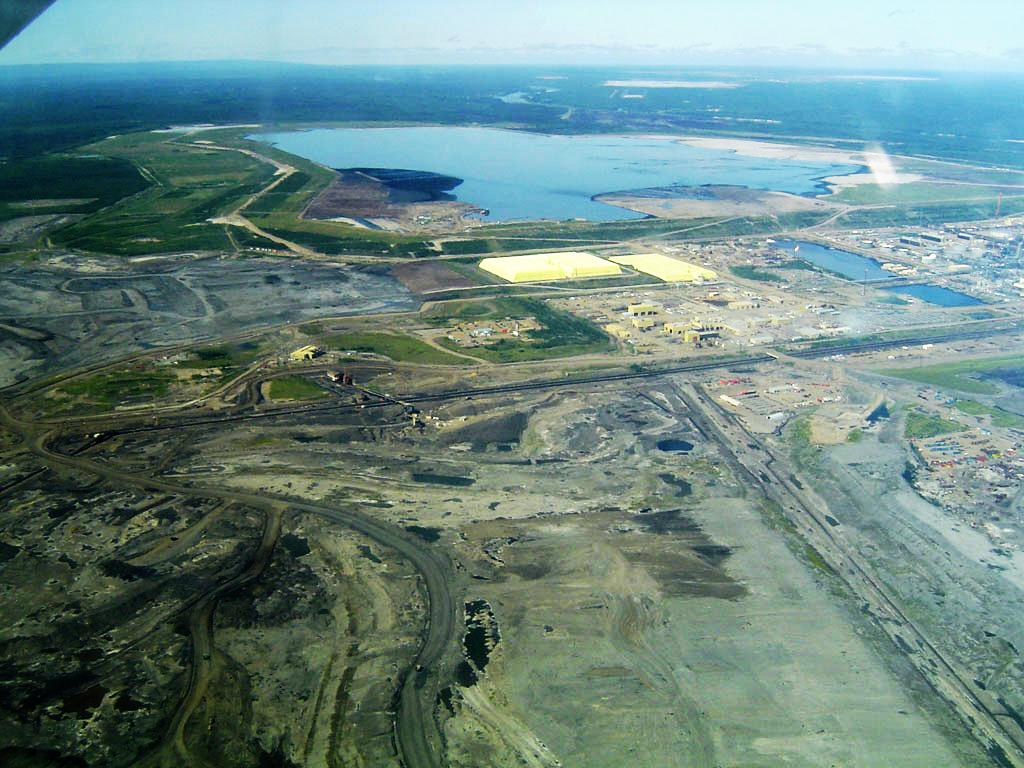
Syncrude Tailings Dam, Fort McMurray, Alberta

A tailings dam is typically an earth-fill embankment dam used to store byproducts of mining operations after separating the ore from the gangue. Tailings can be liquid, solid, or a slurry of fine particles, and are usually highly toxic and potentially radioactive. Solid tailings are often used as part of the structure itself.

Tailings dams rank among the largest engineered structures on earth. The Syncrude Mildred Lake Tailings Dyke in Alberta, Canada, is an embankment dam about 18 kilometres (11 mi) long and from 40 to 88 metres (131 to 289 ft) high. The dam and the artificial lake within it are constructed and maintained as part of ongoing operations by Syncrude in extracting oil from the Athabasca oil sands; it is the largest dam structure on earth by volume, and as of 2001 it was believed to be the largest earth structure in the world by volume of fill.

There are key differences between tailings dams and the more familiar hydroelectric dams. Tailings dams are designed for permanent containment, meaning they are intended to "remain there forever". Copper, gold, uranium, and other mining operations produce varied kinds of waste, much of it toxic, which pose varied challenges for long-term containment.

There are an estimated 29,000 to 35,000 tailings dams around the world with a rate of .011/Mt of world mineral production. The Responsible Mining Foundation found that companies have made little or no progress in improving the documentation and safety practices of these ponds. World Mine Tailings Failures has documented that the number of catastrophic tailings dam failures by decade has steadily increased at a statistically significant level since 2000.

== Structure ==
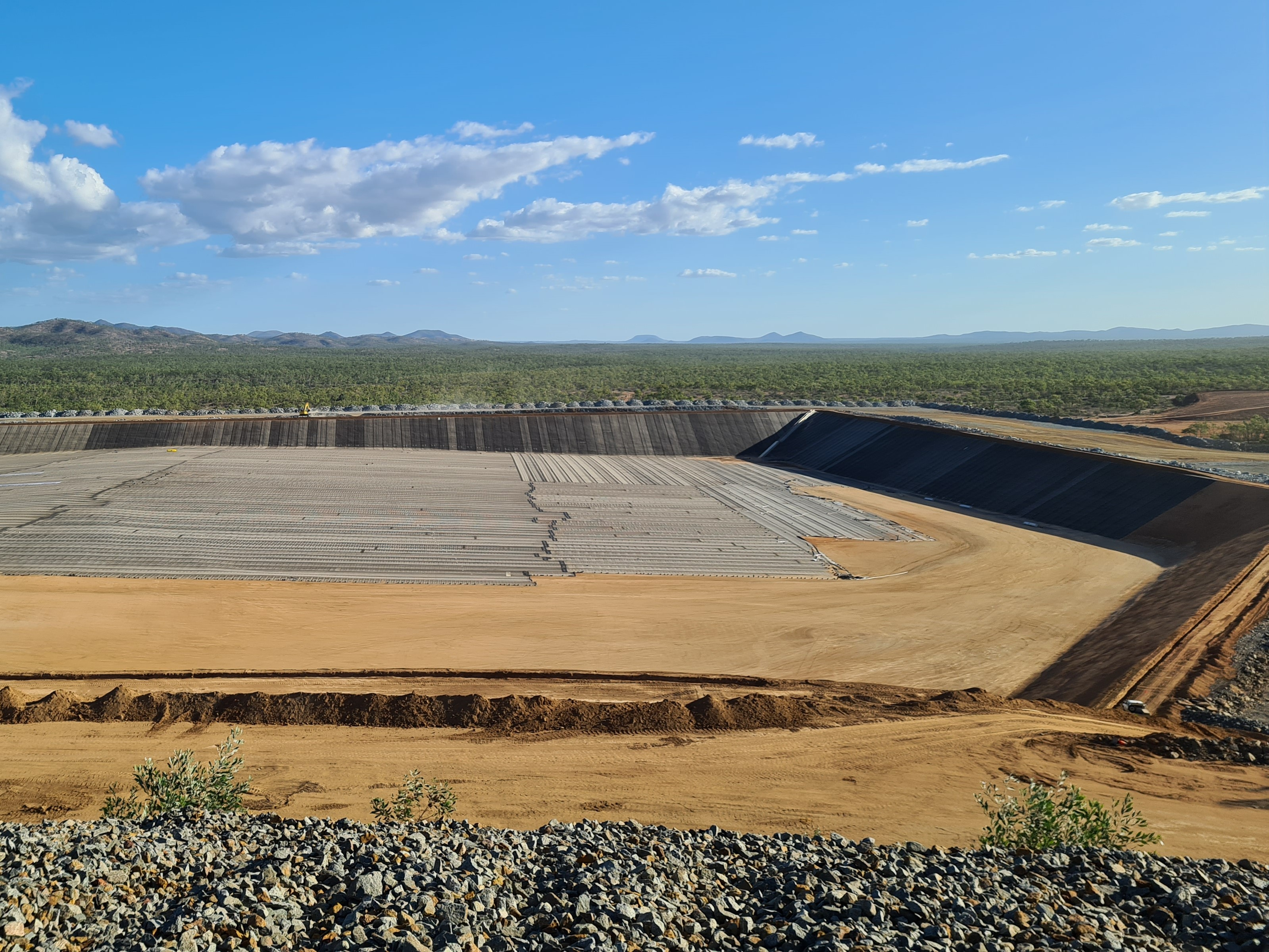
Bituminous geomembrane installation on the base and walls of a tailings storage facility.

Unlike water-retention dams, the height of a tailings dam is typically increased (raised) throughout the life of the particular mine. Typically, a base or starter dam is constructed, and as it fills with a mixture of tailings and water, it is raised. Material used to raise the dam can include the tailings (if their properties are suitable), earthfill, or rockfill. It is increasingly common for barrier systems such as geomembranes to be incorporated into tailings dams. Impermeable barriers can prevent or reduce seepage, thereby increasing the geotechnical and environmental stability of the dam.

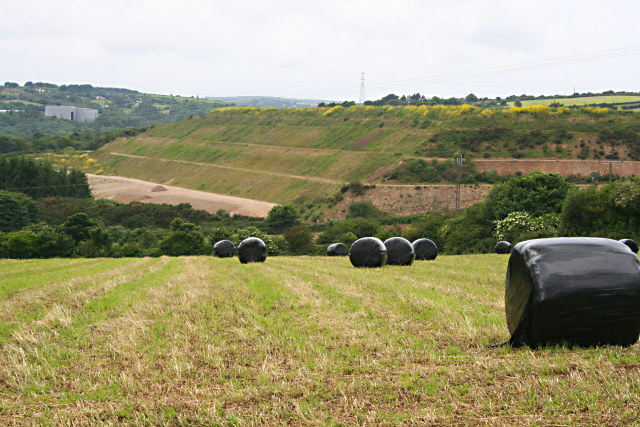
Wheal Jane Tailings Dam, West Cornwall, England

There are three types of dam raises, the upstream, downstream and centerline, named according to the relative position of the new crest of the dam to the previous. The specific design used is dependent upon topography, geology, climate, the type of tailings, and cost. An upstream tailings dam consists of trapezoidal embankments being constructed on top, but toe to crest, of another, moving the crest further upstream. This creates a relatively flat downstream side and a jagged upstream side, which is supported by tailings slurry in the impoundment. The downstream design refers to the successive raising of the embankment that positions the fill and crest further downstream. A centerlined dam has sequential embankment dams constructed directly on top of each other while fill is placed on the downstream side for support and slurry supports the upstream side.

Brazil and Chile have banned the construction of upstream dams, deeming them too dangerous, and the fifty or so in the Brazilian state of Minas Gerais will have to be decommissioned by 2035.

== Tailings stratification and mineralogy ==
The extraction of economic minerals results in an accumulation of tailings on the surface, mostly in tailings ponds, that occupy a large amount of land. Stratification is inherent to sedimentation, as the heavier particles settle before the lighter particles. Yet, tailings can also represent an untapped resource, as many tailings contain valuable secondary minerals. These could be recovered, contributing to the circular economy and reducing the need for new mining operations. Analyzing the mineralogy of tailings can reveal the presence of economically valuable minerals, such as rare earth elements or other metal resources. This is particularly important as global demand for these resources continues to grow. A thorough understanding of tailings stratigraphy helps to identify the most promising areas for recovery and informs processing methods that allow mineral recovery to be maximized while minimizing environmental issues.

=== Tailings stratification ===
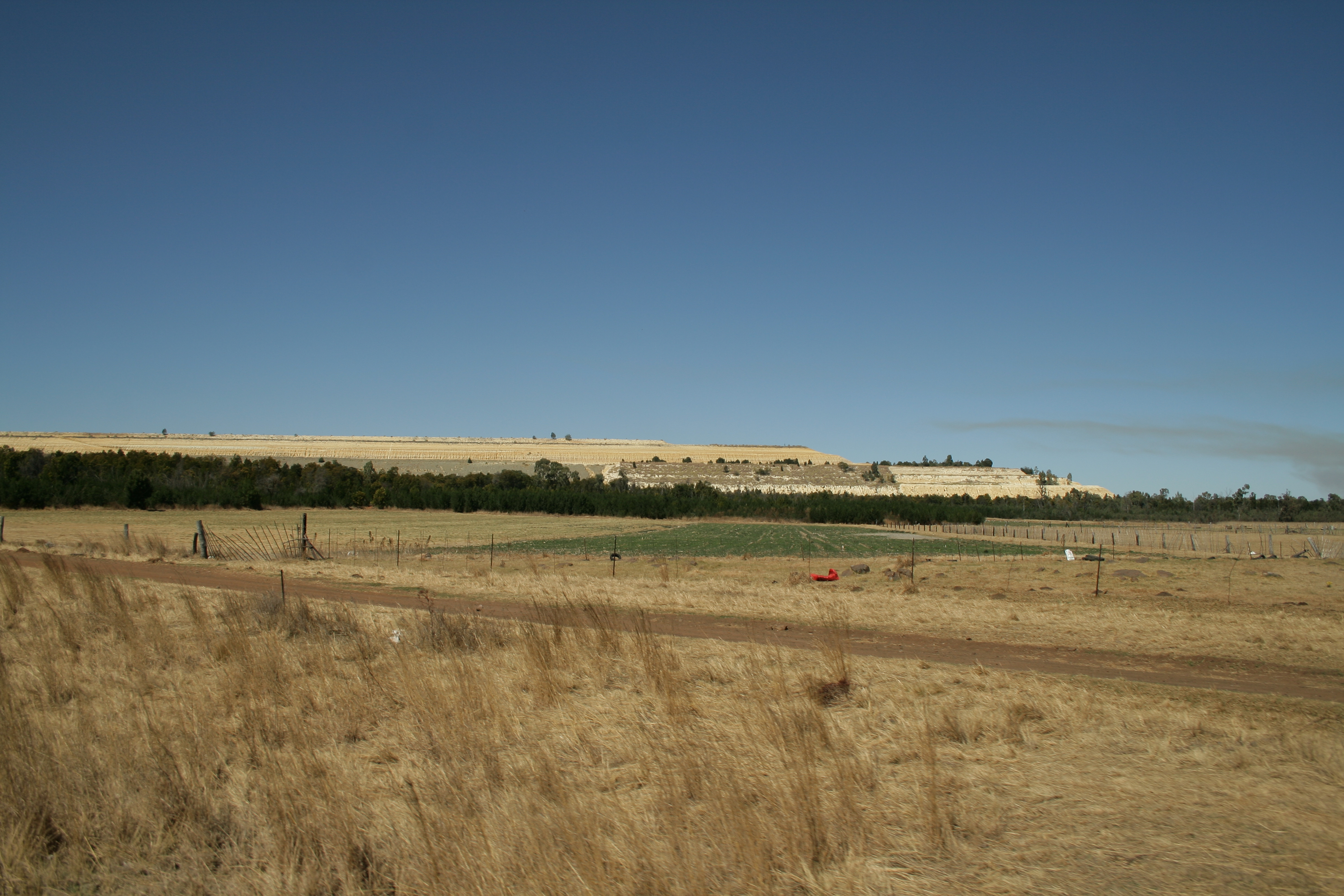
Gold mine tailings near Krugersdorp, South Africa.

Tailings stratification is the layering of tailings due to the distribution in particle size as well as the difference in specific density. The compactness of the sandy to silty tailings influences the permeability, which will influence the drainage ability of the tailings and thus the infiltration line. The infiltration line is the pathway through which water can enter in a specific area, and it affects the safety and stability of tailings ponds.

Furthermore, the tailings' compactness affects how much water they can hold. This also affects how strong and stiff they get to be. The more compact the tailings are, the smaller the permeability coefficient and the stronger the water-holding capacity. Rather than consisting of a single uniform body, tailings are usually composed of multiple layers of sediment that differ in grain size and mineralogical composition. The grain size of tailings can show great fluctuations due to the deposition of larger and finer particles, which influences the tailings stratification and shear strength. When more fine particles settle, it weakens the tailings, which may result in the settled layer holding more water. This could create the saturation line, affecting how safely the tailings storage facility can be operated.

Mineralogical composition in tailings causes the cementation of layers. Sulfide-enriched layers can form protective cemented layers. These layers will usually not form in systems with a homogeneous distribution of iron-bearing sulfide. Therefore, tailings stratification is greatly influenced by the presence of minerals which have a great influence in the cementation of the tailings' layers, by the grain-size distribution which influences the compactness and density of the tailings. However, there are other factors that influence tailings' stratification, such as topography, geological setting, climate, tailings deposition process, and how long the tailings have been stored in the facility.

=== Tailings mineralogy ===
==== Carbon mineralization ====
Carbon mineralization is a natural process that occurs over hundreds or thousands of years, where certain minerals, such as in mine tailings, react with atmospheric carbon dioxide to form solid carbonates. This process effectively sequesters and removes carbon dioxide from the atmosphere. Ultramafic mine tailings, rich in magnesium-bearing minerals such as serpentine, olivine, and brucite, are highly reactive due to their reduced grain size from crushing and have been historically and currently produced in substantial quantities, facilitating carbon mineralization. Using these tailings for carbon mineralization can reduce the costs associated with the extraction and processing of ultramafic rocks, which is often energy-intensive. The mineralogy of these tailings can vary substantially depending on the commodity being mined.

As an example, the Baptiste nickel project in British Columbia, Canada, is known for its potential to mineralize carbon in its tailings. Similarly, the Gahcho Kué diamond mine in the Northwest Territories, Canada, has kimberlite pipes with the potential for carbon mineralization. Tailings from this mine contain a mix of minerals that can facilitate carbon mineralization, contributing to the overall reduction of atmospheric carbon dioxide concentrations. Ultramafic mine tailings are a promising avenue for carbon mineralization, providing both an effective means of carbon sequestration and a way to use waste materials from mining operations.

==== Secondary mineralization ====
Secondary mineralization in tailings involves the formation of new minerals from the alteration or weathering of primary minerals found in mine waste. These secondary minerals develop within tailings impoundments due to weathering processes following mining and milling activities. A key factor in this mineralization is the oxidation of sulfide minerals, which alters dissolved species concentrations, porewater pH, and the overall mineralogy. Within the oxidation zone, primary minerals such as sulfides and carbonates are depleted, leading to the formation of secondary minerals. These secondary minerals are critical, as they help to regulate the concentrations of dissolved species in the pore water.

This study focused on tungsten secondary minerals in tailings generated during a two-year mining operation at the Mount Pleasant Tungsten Mine, approximately 60 kilometres (37 mi) south of Fredericton, New Brunswick. Initially, the tailings were submerged but were exposed to atmospheric oxygen following a dam failure in 1997. The primary mineralogy of the deposit consists mainly of quartz, topaz, fluorite, micas, clays, chlorite, K-feldspars and opaque minerals including wolframite. While the tailings are not extensively oxidized, certain areas have elevated sulfate and metal concentrations including lower pH values.

==== Biomineralization ====
Living organisms, particularly microbes, contribute to the formation of minerals through their metabolic activities. Acidophilic chemolithotrophic bacteria like Thiobacillus are vital to mineralization processes and play a critical role in biomineralization processes in mine tailings. Examples are those found at the abandoned Kam Kotia mine near Timmins, Ontario, Canada, which has been inactive for about 30 years. These bacteria catalyze the production of toxic, acidic metal leachates that can severely affect natural ecosystems.

Under oxidizing conditions, acidophilic chemolithotrophs oxidize ferrous (Fe (II)) sulfides to produce sulfuric acid and ferric (Fe (III)) iron. These bacteria increase the rate of iron (Fe (II)) oxidation at low pH. Certain species, such as Acidithiobacillus ferrooxidans, can also reduce iron (Fe (III)) in both aerobic and anaerobic environments at very low pH. In addition, sulfate-reducing bacteria (SRB) can indirectly influence the iron cycle in mine tailings by reacting with soluble iron (Fe (II)) to form iron sulfide precipitates. Although sulfate-reducing bacteria (SRB) typically prefer neutral, reducing conditions, they have been found in acid mine drainage environments, indicating potential acid tolerance. Although oxygen generally inhibits their activity, recent studies suggest that sulfate-reducing bacteria (SRB) can remain viable in oxygenated conditions and even engage in aerobic sulfate reduction in well-oxygenated microbial mats.

== Largest ==
The largest three tailings dams are:

Rank	Name	Country	Year completed	Structure height [m]	Structure volume [10^{6} m^{3}]	Reservoir volume [10^{9} m^{3}]	Installed capacity [MW]	Type
1	Syncrude Tailings Dam Mildred MLSB	Canada	1995	88	540/720	0.35	NA	TE
2	Syncrude Tailings Dam Mildred SWSS	Canada	2010	40–50	119	0.25	NA	TE
3	ASARCO Mission Mine Tailings Dam	United States	1973	30	40.1	0	NA	ER

Type: TE – Earth; ER – Rock-fill; PG – Concrete gravity; CFRD – Concrete face rock fill

== Concerns ==
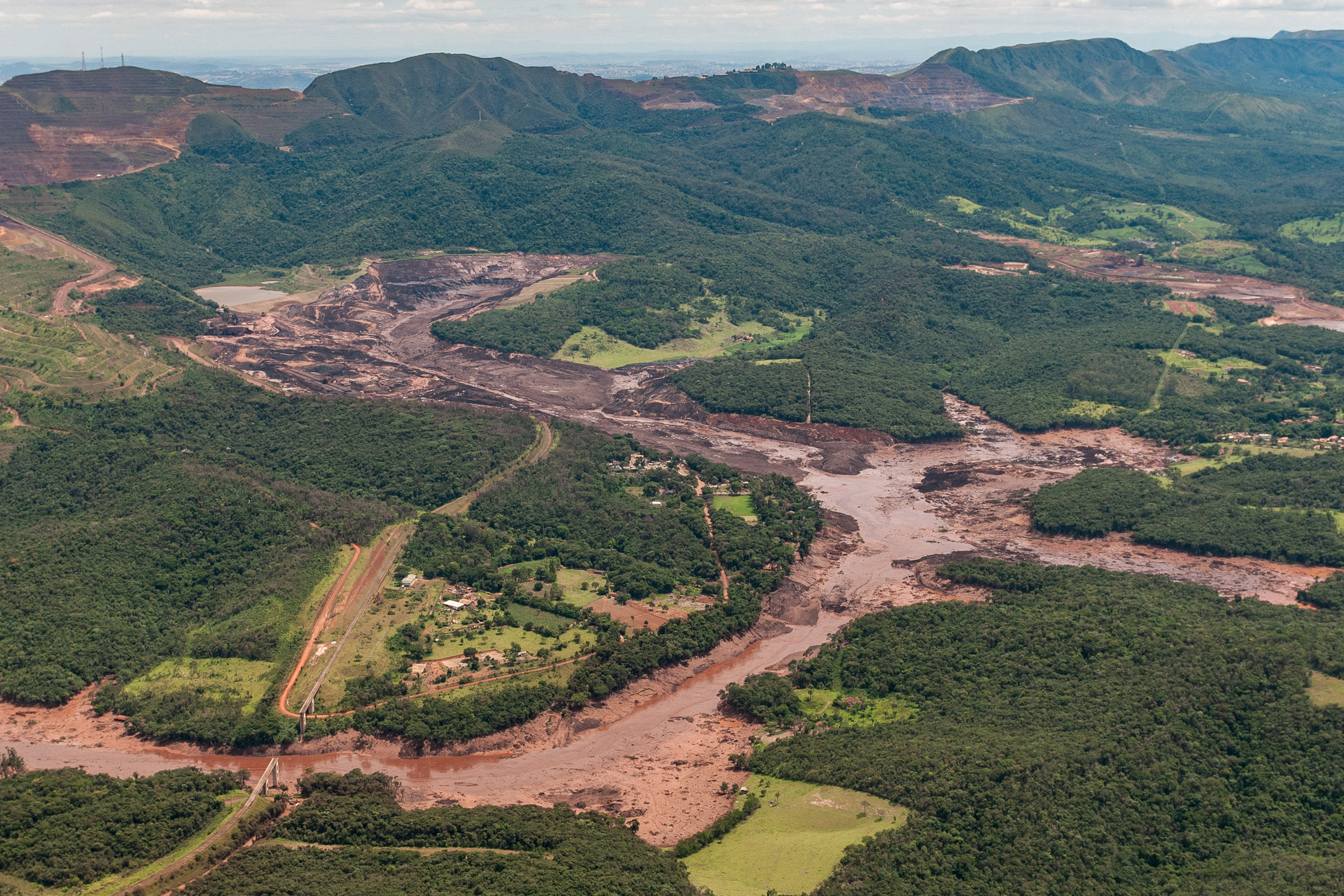
Brumadinho dam disaster in 2019

A tailings dam is a structure that stores mining byproducts, including those that are toxic or radioactive. As a result, the structural failure of tailings dams and the ensuing release of toxic metals into the environment can produce many risks and hazards to an area. The standard of public reporting on tailings dam incidents is poor; a large number remain completely unreported, or lack basic facts when reported. There is no comprehensive database for historic failures. According to mining engineer David M Chambers of the Center for Science in Public Participation, 10,000 years is "a conservative estimate" of how long most tailings dams will need to maintain structural integrity.

== See also ==
- Oil sands tailings ponds (Canada)
- Ash pond
