= Pona =

Pona or PONA may refer to:

== People ==
- Francesco Pona (1595–1655), Italian doctor, philosopher and writer
- Nantachot Pona (born 1982), Thai footballer
- Oumar Pona (born 2006), Malian footballer

== Places ==
- Ponna, a comune in Lombardy, Italy, also known as Pona

== Other uses ==
- PONA number, an index for oil components
- Popular National Party (Tanzania)
- Pona Machaan Thirumbi Vandhan, 1954 Indian film

== See also ==
- Toki Pona, a constructed language
