= TVP =

TVP may stand for:

== Arts and entertainment ==
- Television Personalities, an English post-punk band (formed 1977)
- Televisión Pública, an Argentine broadcaster (named TVP since 2009)
- Telewizja Polska, a Polish broadcaster (founded 1952)
- TV Pendidikan, a Malaysian channel (launched 1972)
- TV Patrol, a Philippine newscast (launched 1987)
- TVP (Mexican TV network) (launched 1964)

== Science, technology and medicine ==
- Transvenous pacing, a heart intervention
- Tricuspid valve prolapse, a heart condition
- True vapor pressure, of petroleum distillate
- TVPaint Animation, 2D animation software (since 1991)

== Transport ==
- Smartwings Poland, a Polish airline (ICAO:TVP; founded 2012)
- Tiverton Parkway railway station, Devon, England (GBR:TVP; opened 1986)

== Other uses ==
- Textured vegetable protein, a soy-based food
- Thames Valley Police, an English constabulary (formed 1968)
