= Oil sands tailings ponds (Canada) =

Engineered dam and dyke systems used to capture oil sand tailings

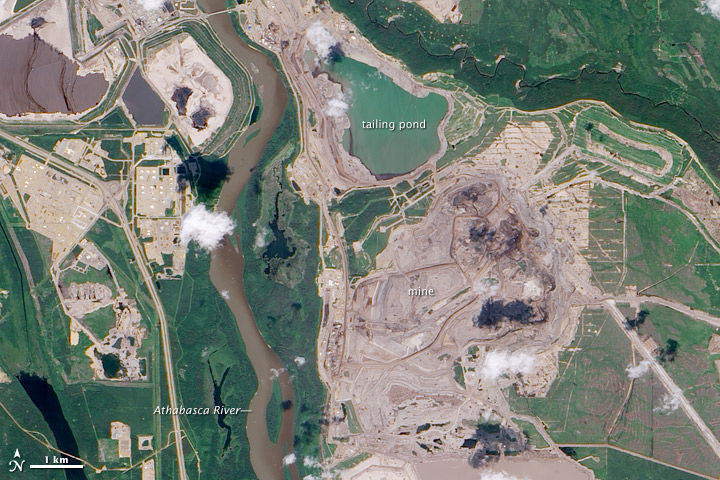
Oil sands tailings ponds

Oil sands tailings ponds are engineered dam and dyke systems used to capture oil sand tailings. Oil sand tailings contain a mixture of salts, suspended solids and other dissolvable chemical compounds such as acids, benzene, hydrocarbons residual bitumen, fine silts and water. Large volumes of tailings are a byproduct of bitumen extraction from the oil sands and managing these tailings is one of the most difficult environmental challenges facing the oil sands industry. Tailings ponds grew by 90 million cubic metres in 2020, reaching 1.36 billion cubic metres of fluids, according to an October 2021 AER report; by 2023, the total volume of fluid tailings in the region had risen further, to 1,486 million cubic metres, while the volume of water held in the ponds had declined, according to AER's most recent tailings management report.

== Location ==
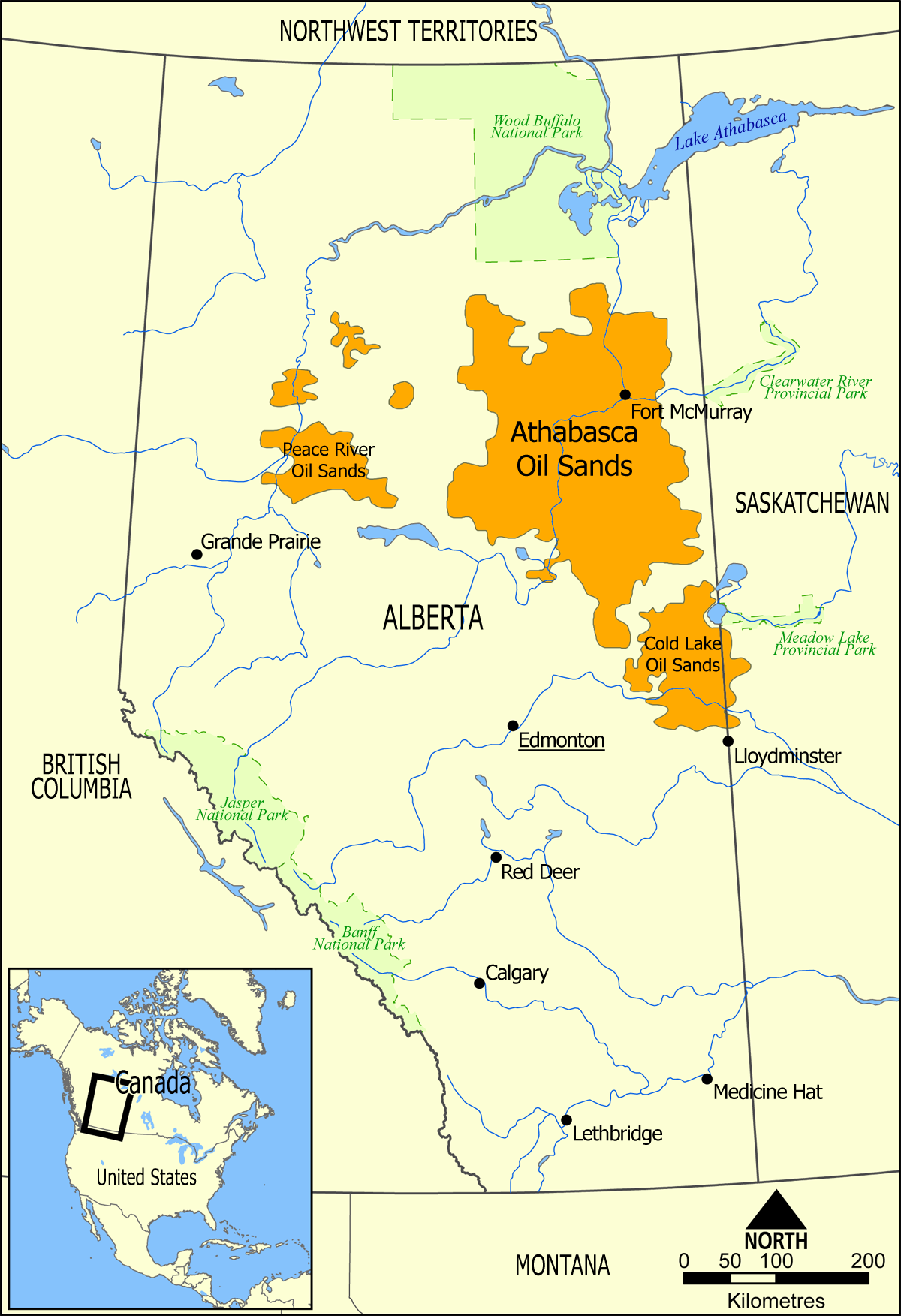
The extent of oil sands in Alberta, Canada

In Canada there are three major oil sand deposits, primarily located in the province of Alberta, with some also located in the neighbouring province of Saskatchewan. They are known as Athabasca Oil Sands, Cold Lake oil sands, and Peace River oil sands. The Athabasca Oil Sands Region (AOSR) has 19 tailings ponds.

== Components of oil sands tailings ponds ==
Oil sand tailings or oil sands process-affected water (OSPW), have a highly variable composition and a complex mixture of compounds. In his oft-cited 2008 journal article, E. W. Allen wrote that typically tailings ponds consist of c. 75% water, c. 25% sand, silt and clay, c.2% of residual bitumen, as well as dissolved salts, organics, and minerals. Although many of the components of TPW "occur naturally in adjacent landscapes, the mining process increases their concentrations", for example, sodium, chloride, sulphate, bicarbonate, and ammonia. Citing research from the 1978 onwards, Allen included naphthenic acids (NAs), bitumen, asphaltenes, creosols, phenols, humic and fulvic acids, benzene, phthalates, toluene, polycyclic aromatic hydrocarbons (PAHs), in the list of organic compounds in TPW. Allen names aromatic hydrocarbons [including polycyclic aromatic hydrocarbons (PAHs), benzene, phenols and toluene], naphthenic acids (NAs) and dissolved solids, as those that were most harmful to humans, fish, and birds. As well as toxic metals considered to be priority pollutants such as chromium, arsenic, nickel, cadmium, copper, lead, and zinc, OSPW also contains "common, low-toxicity metals" including titanium aluminum, molybdenum, iron, and vanadium. The exposure to particulate matter (PM) containing polycyclic aromatic hydrocarbons has been seen to have higher cytotoxicity then PM containing heavy metals.

The concentrations of chemicals are harmful to fish, and oil on the surface of the ponds is harmful to birds.

The lack of knowledge and identification of individual compounds has become a major hindrance to the handling and monitoring of oil sands tailings. A better understanding of the chemical makeup, including naphthenic acids, it may make it possible to monitor rivers for leachate and also to remove toxic components. The identification of individual acids has for many years proved to be impossible but a breakthrough in 2011 in analysis began to reveal what is in the oil sands tailings ponds. Theoretically, as much as ninety percent of the water in the tailings could be reused for further oil extraction.

== Size and scope ==
Tailings volumes and the areas occupied by tailings facilities have increased over time, although published figures are not always directly comparable, as sources may refer to total tailings, fluid tailings, ponded water, or the surface area of tailings facilities.

According to an October 2021 Alberta Energy Regulator (AER) report, in 2020 in spite of a decrease in oil production, oil sands tailings ponds grew another 90 million cubic meters in 2020 containing 1.36 billion cubic metres of fluids. This represents a surface comparable to "1.7 times the size of Vancouver".

In 2008 tailings ponds held 732 billion litres of tailings. By 2009, as tailing ponds continued to proliferate and volumes of fluid tailings increased, the Energy Resources Conservation Board of Alberta issued Directive 074 to force oil companies to manage tailings based on aggressive criteria.

By 2013, the Government of Alberta reported that tailings ponds covered an area of about 77 square kilometres (30 sq mi). According to a Calgary Herald article, by September 2017, the tailings ponds held c."1.2 trillion litres of contaminated water" and covered about 220 square kilometres (85 sq mi).

According to the Alberta Energy Regulator (AER), the total volume of fluid tailings—new and legacy tailings combined—at oil sands mine sites in the Athabasca oil sands region increased from 1,441 million cubic metres in 2022 to 1,486 million cubic metres in 2023. Over the same period, the volume of water held in fluid tailings ponds in the region decreased from 417.5 million cubic metres to 391.1 million cubic metres.

== Cost of clean-up ==
A 2018 joint investigation by the Toronto Star, Global News, National Observer, and four journalism schools—Concordia University, Ryerson University, University of Regina and University of British Columbia—revealed that the estimated liability for the clean up cost for "oilsands mining operations facilities" was about $130 billion. The investigation, which resulted in the news coverage series, The Price of Oil, was undertaken by "the largest ever collaboration of journalists in Canada". The investigation revealed that the security collected from companies to cover the costs of shutting down and cleaning up mining sites including tailings ponds and pipelines was $1.4 billion; and the previous calculated liability was $27.80 billion. The clean-up of tailings ponds, which "have sprawled to cover an area the size of Kelowna", which is 211.8 km^{2} (81.8 sq mi), represents a "significant part of the liability." The journalists working on the Price of Oil series were told by experts that the liabilities in the oilsands, mainly tailings ponds, represent almost 50% of the $130 billion in the AER mining category, the total estimated liability.

Documents released through the freedom of information legislation as requested for the joint investigation of Alberta Energy Regulator internal documents included Rob Wadsworth's speaking notes at a February 28, 2018, presentation to the Petroleum History Society in Calgary. Wadsworth warned that "the true costs of cleaning up the oils sands" could be $260 billion and a significant part of the costs include the clean-up of toxic tailings ponds. In his outline of the financial liabilities in Alberta's oil patch, Wadsworth, who was the AER vice president of closure and liability, said that with the rules in place in 2018, fossil fuel companies could put off setting aside enough money to cover the costs of cleaning up their sites, until their business could "no longer afford to pay anything". He warned that even though weaknesses in the flawed programs were known, there was no "proactive change to the liability programs." Until about 2018, the "implications of our flawed system had not been not realized". He cautioned that if the industry did not respond, it would be the public that felt the impact and called on the industry representatives to retain the liabilities so they are "not passed on to Albertans". In response to the report, then Environment Minister of Alberta Shannon Phillips said that Wadsworth's estimates represented a "worst-case scenario" in which the industry shuts down overnight."

=== Syncrude Tailings Dam ===
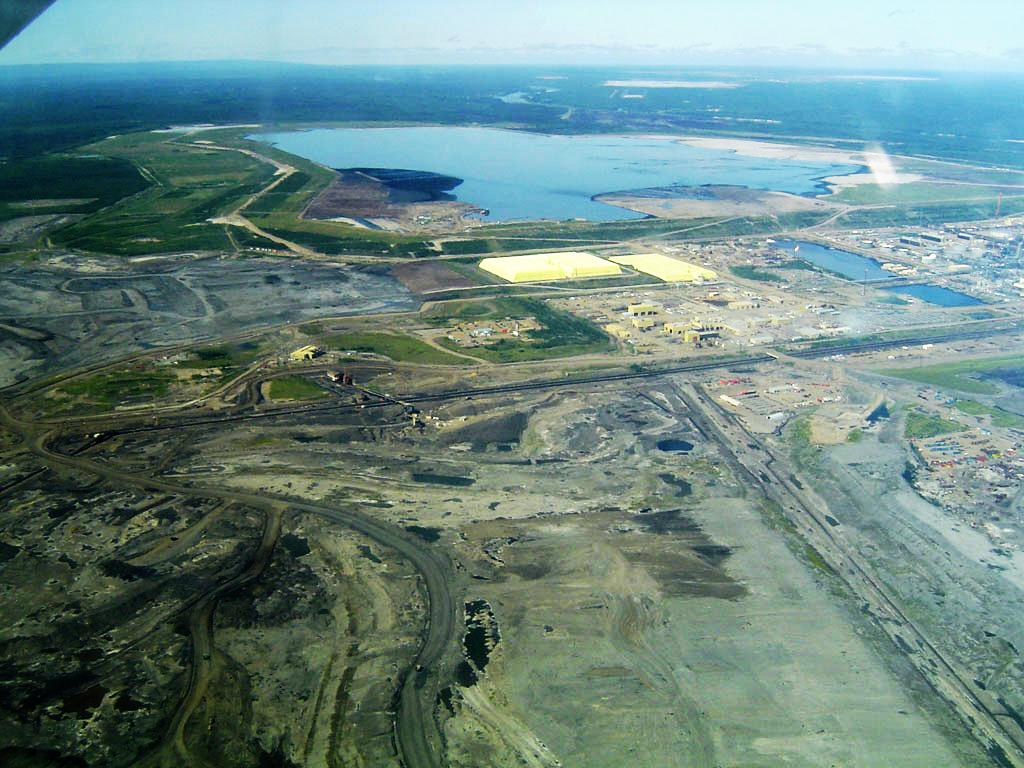
Syncrude tailings dam

The Syncrude Tailings Dam or Mildred Lake Settling Basin (MLSB) is an embankment dam that was, by volume of construction material, the largest earth structure in the world in 2001. It is located 40 km (25 mi) north of Fort McMurray, Alberta, Canada, at the northern end of the Mildred Lake lease owned by Syncrude Canada Ltd. The dam and the tailings artificial lake within it are constructed and maintained as part of ongoing operations by Syncrude in extracting oil from the Athabasca Oil Sands. Other tailings dams constructed and operated in the same area by Syncrude include the Southwest Sand Storage (SWSS), which is the third largest dam in the world by volume of construction material after the Tarbela Dam. The MLSB, which is the oldest tailings pond in the Athabasca Oil Sands Region (AOSR), was found in a 2018 report published in the Atmospheric Chemistry and Physics journal to be "responsible for the majority of tailings ponds emissions of methane."

On 31 December 2018, Syncrude was fined $2.75 million after pleading guilty under the federal Migratory Birds Convention Act (MBCA) and Alberta's Environmental Protection and Enhancement Act in relation to the deaths of 31 great blue herons in August 2015 at the MLSB. At the time the MLSB inactive sump "was not covered by Syncrude's waterfowl protection plan to deter birds from landing at tailings areas". Doreen Cole, who has been managing director of Syncrude Canada since December 2017, "We immediately took steps to bring all these areas on our Mildred Lake and Aurora sites into our waterfowl protection plan. We're committed to being a responsible operator and this has strengthened our resolve to reduce the impact of our operations on wildlife." On 22 October 2010 Syncrude was found guilty under the provincial and federal Acts and was fined $3-million, which at that time represented the "largest environmental penalty in Alberta history." In 2008, 1,606 ducks died in Syncrude's tailings ponds, which at that time covered an area of 12-square-kilometres, because "cannons, effigies and other deterrents", intended for use to deter migratory birds, had not been deployed. Syncrude's trial lawyer at that time, Robert White, had urged his client to challenge the guilty verdict. But Syncrude spokeswoman said that they would plead guilty and pay the fine as, "At Syncrude, we're eager to move forward. The incident haunted us and we regret that it ever happened."

=== Horizon tailings dam ===
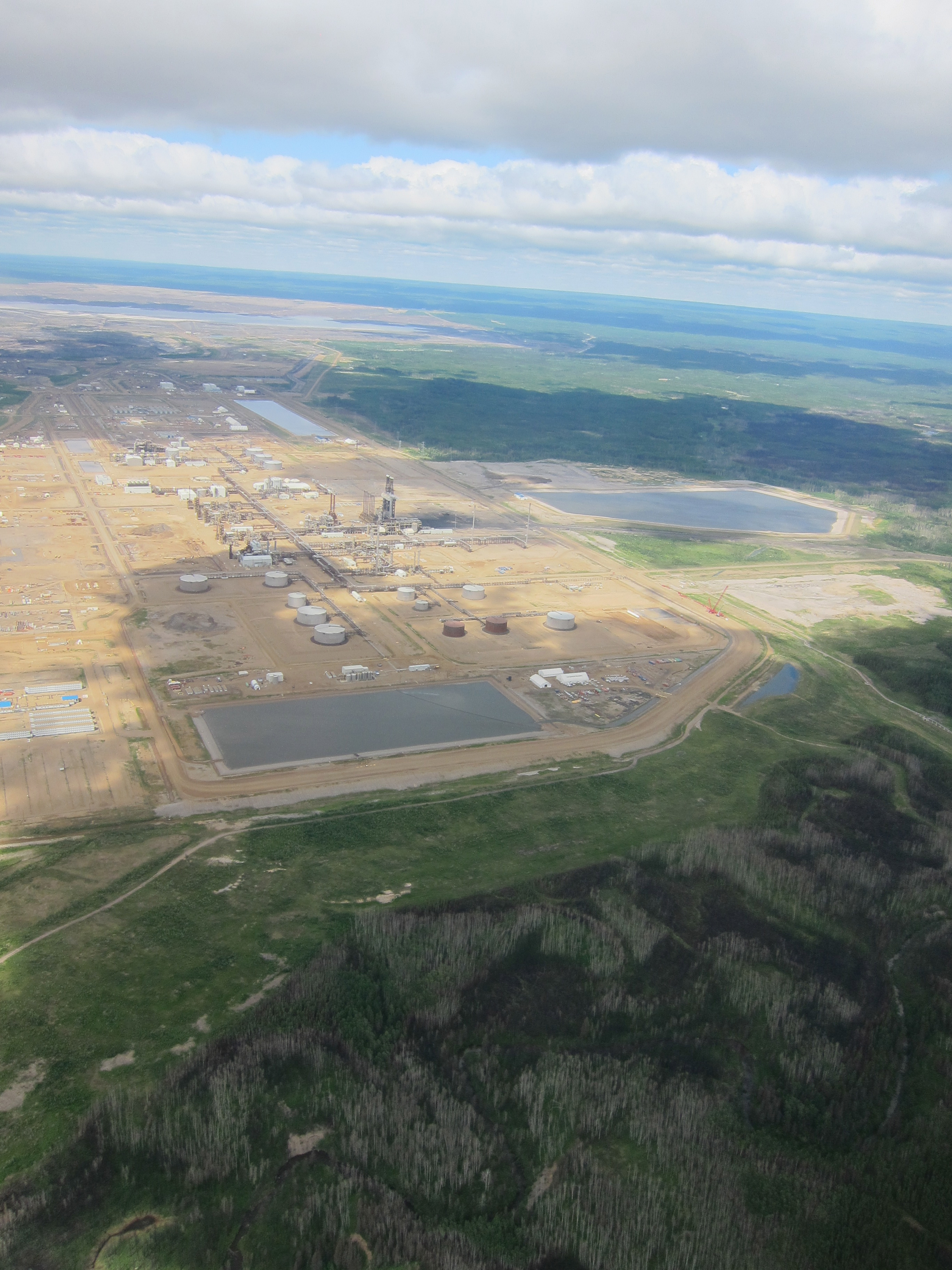
Horizon tailings dam

As of 2010, according to the "Mature Fine Tailings Inventory from mine operator tailings plans submitted in October 2009, Canadian Natural Resources's (CNRL) mine, Horizon mine had 48,000,000 cubic metres (1.7×10^{9} cu ft) of mature fine tailings (MFT) in their tailings ponds. However COSIA argues that CNRL's Horizon External Tailings Facility (ETF) is a relatively young pond with a configuration that minimizes the "Pond Centre (PC) depositional environment". It has a "side hill" facility with a three-sided dyke impounding fluid against the natural ground that rises away from the containment dyke."

== Regulations and oversight ==
From its establishment in January 2008, until it was disbanded in 2013, the Edmonton, Alberta-based Energy Resources Conservation Board (ERCB)—an independent, quasi-judicial agency of the Government of Alberta—regulated Alberta's energy resource industry, which included oils sands tailings ponds. Board members included engineers, geologists, technicians, economists, and other professionals. The ERCB was created to replace the Alberta Energy and Utilities Board (EUB) and the Alberta Utilities Commission. The ERCB's first major publication was the December 2008, Directive 073: Requirements for Inspection and Compliance of Oil Sands Mining and Processing Plant Operations in the Oil Sands Mining Area, which was based Oil Sands Conservation Act (OSCA), Oil Sands Conservation Regulation (OSCR), Informational Letter (IL) 96-07: EUB/AEP Memorandum of Understanding on the Regulation of Oil Sands Development, IL 94-19: Dam Safety Accord, Agreement Between Alberta Employment, Immigration and Industry and the Alberta Energy and Utilities Board Respecting the Coordination of Services for Coal and Oil Sands Mine Projects (EII/EUB MOU), requirements set out in approval conditions for each oil sands mining and processing plant scheme, operator's ERCB-approved S-23 production accounting manual, Interim Directive (ID) 2001-07: Operating Criteria: Resource Recovery Requirements for Oil Sands Mine and Processing Plants, ID 2001-03: Sulphur Recovery Guidelines for the Province of Alberta, and Directive 019: ERCB Compliance Assurance—Enforcement.

In 2009, the ERCB published an industry wide directive—Directive 074—which was the first of its kind. Directive 074 set out the "industry-wide requirements for tailings management," requiring "operators to commit resources to research, develop, and implement fluid tailings reduction technologies and to commit to tailings management and progressive reclamation as operational priorities that are integrated with mine planning and bitumen production activities."

In 2012, the Government of Alberta set up a Tailings Management Framework (TMF) to complement and expand Directive 074's policies to "ensure that fluid fine tailings are reclaimed as quickly as possible and that current inventories are reduced."

The ECRB report entitled 2012 Tailings Management Assessment Report: Oil Sands Mining Industry, cautioned that oil sands operators failed to convert their tailings ponds into deposits suitable for reclamation in a timely fashion, as proposed in their project applications. "The volume of fluid tailings, and the area required to hold fluid tailings, continued to grow, and the reclamation of tailings ponds was further delayed."

The Government of Alberta released the 2012 "Tailings Management Framework for Mineable Oil Sands" as part of Alberta's Progressive Reclamation Strategy for the oil sands to ensure that tailings are reclaimed as quickly as possible.

The ERCB's 2013 "Tailings Management Framework for Mineable Oil Sands" "challenged a "key plank" of the Conservative provincial government, under Premier Alison Redford, who served from October 2011 until her resignation on 23 March 2014. During the tenure of the Redford cabinet, the province was promoting "Alberta as a responsible energy producer." The government had pledged that the "turbid tailings ponds containing the byproducts of bitumen production will soon be a thing of the past." In April 2013, Premier undertook a trade mission to Washington, D.C., in which she said that, "tailings ponds [will] disappear from Alberta's landscape in the very near future." She said that there would be new environmental rules that will force "companies who do use mines and tailings" to "completely halt the growth of fluid tailings ponds by 2016."

In 2013, the Alberta government replaced the ERCB with the newly created Alberta Energy Regulator (AER), with Jim Ellis, as CEO. The AER's mandate included overseeing the "development of hydrocarbon resources over their entire life cycle", which included "allocating and conserving water resources, and managing public lands." The AER was also tasked with "protecting the environment while providing economic benefits for all Albertans."

In March 2015, in response to the ERCB's "Tailings Management Framework for Mineable Oil Sands", AER suspended Directive 074: Tailings Performance Criteria and Requirements for Oil Sands Mining Schemes.

In May 2016, the Court of Queen's Bench of Alberta (ABQB) in 2016 ABQB 278, "confirmed that the federal Bankruptcy and Insolvency Act supersedes the provincial requirements that companies must clean up wells." "[B]ankrupt companies can avoid their liabilities and leave them as a public obligation."

Directive 85 was issued on 14 July 2016, by the Alberta Energy Regulator, following consultations with "consultations with First Nations, local communities, environmental groups and industry itself". Directive 85 with new guidelines and a phased-in approach on oil sands producers' management of their tailings ponds. Under Directive 85 "fluid tailings" must be "ready to reclaim" within ten years of the closing of an oil sands mine.

On 25 April 2017, the Court of Appeal of Alberta (ABCA) dismissed the AER and OWA's appeal in a landmark decision, affirming the May 2016 decision of the Court of Queen's Bench of Alberta in favour of Redwater Energy Corporation's receiver, Grant Thornton Limited, in Redwater's bankruptcy proceedings. The ABCA found that Grant Thornton Limited "entitled to disclaim Redwater's non-producing oil wells and sell its producing ones".

In July 2019, the AER announced their Decision 2019 ABAER 006: Syncrude Canada Ltd. Mildred Lake Extension Project and Mildred Lake Tailings Management Plan, with a 289-page report. Syncrude's had submitted their request regarding the Mineral Surface Lease MSL352 on 30 June 2017. The AER decision allows Syncrude to use more public lands to develop oil sands on oil sands leases 17 and 22, under section 20 of the Public Lands Act, with a number of conditions, related to relevant laws, including the Oil Sands Conservation Act (OSCA), the Environmental Protection and Enhancement Act (EPEA), the Water Act, and the Public Lands Act. The AER found that Syncrude's Mildred Lake Extension (MLX) project was in the "public interest."

The AER found that Mildred Lake Extension Project (MLX) did not meet Directive 085: Fluid Tailings Management for Oil Sands Mining Projects requirements. Syncrude has until January 2023 to submit an "updated Tailings Management Plan" that aligns with Tailings Management Framework for the Mineable Oil Sands (TMF). The "TMF under the Lower Athabasca Regional Plan (LARP) provides direction to the AER and industry on the management of fluid tailings during and after mine operation. AER Directive 085, under the Oil Sands Conservation Act (OSCA), "sets out requirements for managing fluid tailings for oil sands mining projects." (Note: The project includes two new open-pit mining operations that would operate with "conventional shovel and truck mining technology". The Mildred Lake Extension (MLX east), located west of the Athabasca River, and Mildred Lake Extension (MLX west), west of the Mackay River are about 35 kilometres (km) north of Fort McMurray the Regional Municipality of Wood Buffalo (RMWB) and about 10 km north of the hamlet of Fort McKay. Most of Fort McKay is situated on Fort McKay First Nation (FMFN) lands. These two new mines would extend Syncrude's mining activity using old technologies by about 14 years (AER 2019:2).)

=== AER on cost of clean-up of tailings ponds ===
In an AER presentation in February 2018, the AER's "vice-president of closure and liability" said that "based on "a hypothetical worst-case scenario", the cleanup cost would be $260-billion based on "internal AER calculations". The oil industry's "accumulated environmental liability" estimate of $58.65 billion was the amount that the AER had publicly reported. Of that cost, "tailings ponds make up the largest but unknown portion of this AER estimate".

On 15 February 2018 the Supreme Court of Canada held a hearing centering on Alberta's lower courts' findings in favour of Redwater Energy's creditors, to determine if Canada's bankruptcy laws are in conflict with Alberta's regulatory regime – and if those federal laws are paramount to the province's environmental rules".

By February, 2018, there were 1,800 abandoned or orphan wells—sites that had been licensed by AER with combined liabilities of over $110 million. From 2014 to 2018 the industry-led organization's Orphan Well Association's (OWA) inventory, increased from 1,200 to over 3,700.

In late February 2018, CBC News and CP reported that Sequoia Resources Ltd, an oil firm that had purchased "licences for 2,300 wells" in 2016 from Perpetual Energy Inc., had notified AER that it was ceasing operations "imminently" and were unable to maintain "almost 200 facilities and nearly 700 pipeline segments". Sequoia Resources Ltd had defaulted on its "municipal tax payments" and could not reclaim its properties. According to The Star, after Sequoia Resources Ltd filed for bankruptcy protection in March "without decommissioning and cleaning up 4,000 wells, pipelines and other facilities", as required of all oil companies,

On 7 August 2018 PricewaterhouseCoopers, the trustee for Chinese investors who purchased Sequoia Resources Ltd in 2016, launched a lawsuit against Perpetual Energy Inc. in an "unprecedented bid to void" the 2016 sale of Perpetual Energy Inc.'s subsidiary called Perpetual Energy Operating Corp. (PEOC) now known as Sequoia Resources Ltd to Chinese investors. (Note: Perpetual Energy Inc. was created in 2002 as a spin out of Paramount Resources, owned by Clayton Riddell, a Calgary billionaire who died on 15 September 2018. Clayton Riddell remained as Chairman of Perpetual Energy Inc. from its inception in 2002 until Riddell's passing in 2018. Riddell owned 41.7% of Perpetual Energy Inc. and his daughter, Susan Riddell Rose, who is Perpetual's CEO, owns a 4.8%. In August 2018, Perpetual Energy Inc. had a market capitalization of about $40-million. It is alleged in a court filing that in 2016 Susan Riddell Rose "engineered the sale of a subsidiary called Perpetual Energy Operating Corp. (PEOC), later renamed Sequoia" to Chinese investors. In March 2018 Sequoia filed for bankruptcy protection.) An article in The Globe and Mail said that this appears to be the "first attempt by a bankruptcy trustee in Alberta to have a previous oil and gas transaction unwound." It could "introduce major new risks to the [oil and gas] industry's ability to buy and sell assets and could also deliver a severe blow to Perpetual." The lawsuit alleges that Perpetual and its CEO Susan Riddell Rose "knew the deal would sink the buyer". Perpetual says that "the claim is without merit".

In a public statement released on 8 August 2018, AER CEO Jim Ellis, who had been CEO since AER's creation in 2013, took the "unusual step" of admitting that the Sequoia "situation has exposed a gap in the system" that needed to be fixed and "raised questions" about how to proceed in the future. (Note: From 2012 to 2017, the increase in insolvencies has led to an increase in the number of orphan wells to increase from 100 to 3,200. In 2017 there were 450,000 wells registered in Alberta with about 155,000 "no longer producing but not yet fully remediated". In their 2017 report, the C.D. Howe estimated the cost of clean up of orphan wells was as high as $8 billion.)

On 1 November 2018 AER CEO Jim Ellis apologized for failing to report "that cleaning up after the province's oil and gas industry would cost $260 billion". On 2 November he announced his retirement as CE0.

At Canadian federal government level, in May 2023, passing of Bill S-5 to update the Canadian Environmental Protection Act was reported as having slowed because of Liberal Party support for an amendment proposed by the New Democratic Party. The amendment stipulated that "... the federal government has the power to compel the production of information about tailings ponds".

=== Cleanup technology funding (2026) ===
In March 2026, the Alberta government announced $46 million in TIER funding for nine cleanup-technology projects — a small fraction of the $130–260 billion in estimated oilsands liability reported in 2018. The funding was announced alongside a provincial plan to introduce a 120-day regulatory approval timeline for energy projects deemed to be in the provincial interest, part of a broader strategy to double Alberta's oil and gas production by 2035.

== Reduction and reclamation ==
The Alberta Energy Regulator has confirmed that no tailings have ever been certified reclaimed to date. In fact, across the entire oil sands region, only one square km of the total area disturbed by mining operations has ever been certified reclaimed.

Suncor invested $1.2 billion in their Tailings Reduction Operations (TROTM) method that treats mature fine tails (MFT) from tailings ponds with chemical flocculant, an anionic Polyacrylamide, commonly used in water treatment plants to improve removal of total organic content (TOC), to speed their drying into more easily reclaimable matter. Mature tailings dredged from a pond bottom in suspension were mixed with a polymer flocculant and spread over a "beach" with a shallow grade where the tailings would dewater and dry under ambient conditions. The dried MFT can then be reclaimed in situ or moved to another location for final reclamation. Suncor hoped this would reduce the time for water reclamation from tailings to weeks rather than years, with the recovered water being recycled into the oil sands plant. Suncor claimed the mature fines tailings process would reduce the number of tailing ponds and shorten the time to reclaim a tailing pond from 40 years at present to 7–10 years, with land rehabilitation continuously following 7 to 10 years behind the mining operations. For the reporting periods from 2010 to 2012, Suncor had a lower-than-expected fines capture performance from this technology.

Syncrude used the older composite tailings (CT) technology to capture fines at its Mildred Lake project. Syncrude had a lower-than-expected fines capture performance in 2011/2012 but exceeded expectations in 2010/2011. Shell used atmospheric fines drying (AFD) technology combined "fluid tailings and flocculants and deposits the mixture in a sloped area to allow the water to drain and the deposit to dry" and had a lower-than-expected fines capture performance.

=== Suncor's Wapisiw Lookout ===
By 2010 Suncor had transformed their first tailings pond, Pond One, into Wapisiw Lookout, the first reclaimed settling basin in the oil sands. In 2007 the area was a 220-hectare pond of toxic effluent but several years later there was firm land planted with black spruce and trembling aspen. Wapisiw Lookout represents only one percent of tailings ponds in 2011 but Pond One was the first effluent pond in the oil sands industry in 1967 and was used until 1997. By 2011 only 65 square kilometres were cleaned up and about one square kilometre was certified by Alberta as a self-sustaining natural environment. Wapisiw Lookout has not yet been certified. Closure operations of Pond One began in 2007. The jello-like mature fine tails (MFT) were pumped and dredged out of the pond and relocated to another tailings pond for long-term storage and treatment. The MFT was then replaced with 30 million tonnes clean sand and then topsoil that had been removed from the site in the 1960s. The 1.2 million cubic meters of topsoil over the surface, to a depth of 50 centimetres, was placed on top of the sand in the form of hummocks and swales. It was then planted with reclamation plants.

This often-cited example of reclamation is challenged by environmental groups, who point out that the pond is not reclaimed, as the actual harmful tailings fluids were just moved somewhere else. Indeed, the pond's content was drained, and the tailings fluids were transported to other ponds. The pond was then filled with coarser materials and vegetation was added on top. The site is not usable or accessible to the public, and the peatland was not restored.

=== Syncrude's Sandhill Fen project ===
In 2008 Syncrude Canada Ltd. began construction of Sandhill Fen project, a 57-hectare research watershed- creating a mix of forest and wetland- on top of sand-capped composite tailings at its former 60-metre deep East Mine.

=== End Pit Lakes ===
The Pembina Institute suggested that the huge investments by many companies in Canadian oil sands was leading to increased production results in excess bitumen with no place to store it. It added that by 2022 a month's output of waste-water could result in an 11-feet deep toxic reservoir the size of New York City's Central Park [840.01 acres (339.94 ha) (3.399 km^{2})].

The oil sands industry may build a series of up to thirty lakes by pumping water into old mine pits when they have finished excavation leaving toxic effluent at their bottoms and letting biological processes restore it to health. It is less expensive to fill abandoned open pit mines with water instead of dirt. In 2012, the Cumulative Environmental Management Association (CEMA) defined End Pit Lakes (EPLs) as

An engineered water body, located below grade in an oil sands post-mining pit. It may contain oil sands by-product material and will receive surface and groundwater from surrounding reclaimed and undisturbed landscapes. EPLs will be permanent features in the final reclaimed landscape, discharging water to the downstream environment.

— CEMA 2012

Syncrude Ltd. has a full-scale, operational EPL known as Base Mine Lake, which has been under reclamation since 2012. Originally West-In Pit, a tailings pond, Base Mine Lake contains 45 meters of fluid tailings are weighted down by 5 meters of water, compressing the tailings so much that the water cap is now 12 meters in depth. The addition of a water cap and alum successfully cleared the water of turbidity. Algae and invertebrates populate the water column, and the bacterial communities are distinct from those of tailings ponds. However, as an oil sheen does remain on the surface of the lake, Syncrude does not plan to connect this EPL with natural water bodies, or release any water from the site.

== Research ==
In March 2012 an alliance of oil companies called Canada's Oil Sands Innovation Alliance (COSIA) was launched with a mandate to share research and technology to decrease the negative environmental impact of oil sands production focusing on tailings ponds, greenhouse gases, water and land. Almost all the water used to produce crude oil using steam methods of production ends up in tailings ponds. Recent enhancements to this method include Tailings Oil Recovery (TOR) units which recover oil from the tailings, Diluent Recovery Units to recover naphtha from the froth, Inclined Plate Settlers (IPS) and disc centrifuges. These allow the extraction plants to recover well over 90% of the bitumen in the sand.

In January 2013, scientists from Queen's University published a report analyzing lake sediments in the Athabasca region over the past fifty years. They found that levels of polycyclic aromatic hydrocarbons (PAHs) had increased as much as 23-fold since bitumen extraction began in the 1960s. Levels of carcinogenic, mutagenic, and teratogenic PAHs were substantially higher than guidelines for lake sedimentation set by the Canadian Council of Ministers of the Environment in 1999. The team discovered that the contamination spread farther than previously thought.

For metal concentrations, some studies of metal contaminants in Peace-Athabasca Delta lake sediments in 2014 to 2018 showed "... little to no evidence of recent oil sands-derived metals enrichment in sediment of lakes" in the region.

== Emissions ==
According to the 2018 study by Baray et al., ninety-six per cent of methane emissions in the AOSR came from Mildred Lake Settling Basin and the Syncrude Mildred Lake West In-Pit (WIP) pond and Suncor Energy OSG's Ponds 2–3 (P23). MLSB "was found to be responsible for over 70% of tailings ponds emissions of methane (CH_{4})." The study collected data on emission rates of CH_{4} from the "five major facilities in the AOSR: Syncrude Mildred Lake (SML), Suncor Energy OSG (SUN), Canadian Natural Resources Limited Horizon (CNRL), Shell Albian Muskeg River and Jackpine (SAJ) and Syncrude Aurora (SAU)." 2018 report published in the Atmospheric Chemistry and Physics journal to be "responsible for the majority of tailings ponds emissions of methane."

== See also ==
- Tailings
