= Crude oil assay =

Crude oil analysis

A crude oil assay is the chemical evaluation of crude oil feedstocks by petroleum testing laboratories. Each crude oil type has unique molecular and chemical characteristics. No two crude oil types are identical and there are crucial differences in crude oil quality. The results of crude oil assay testing provide extensive detailed hydrocarbon analysis data for refiners, oil traders and producers. Assay data help refineries determine if a crude oil feedstock is compatible for a particular petroleum refinery or if the crude oil could cause yield, quality, production, environmental and other problems.

The assay can be an inspection assay or comprehensive assay. Testing can include crude oil characterization of whole crude oils and the various boiling range fractions produced from physical or simulated distillation by various procedures. Information obtained from the petroleum assay is used for detailed refinery engineering and client marketing purposes. Feedstock assay data are an important tool in the refining process.

== See also ==
- API gravity
- Cetane index
- K factor (crude oil refining)
- Octane rating
- Petroleum coke
- PONA number
- Ramsbottom carbon residue
- Reid vapor pressure
- Saturate, aromatic, resin and asphaltene (aka SARA)
- True vapor pressure
