= Kearl Oil Sands Project =

Oil sands mine in Alberta, Canada

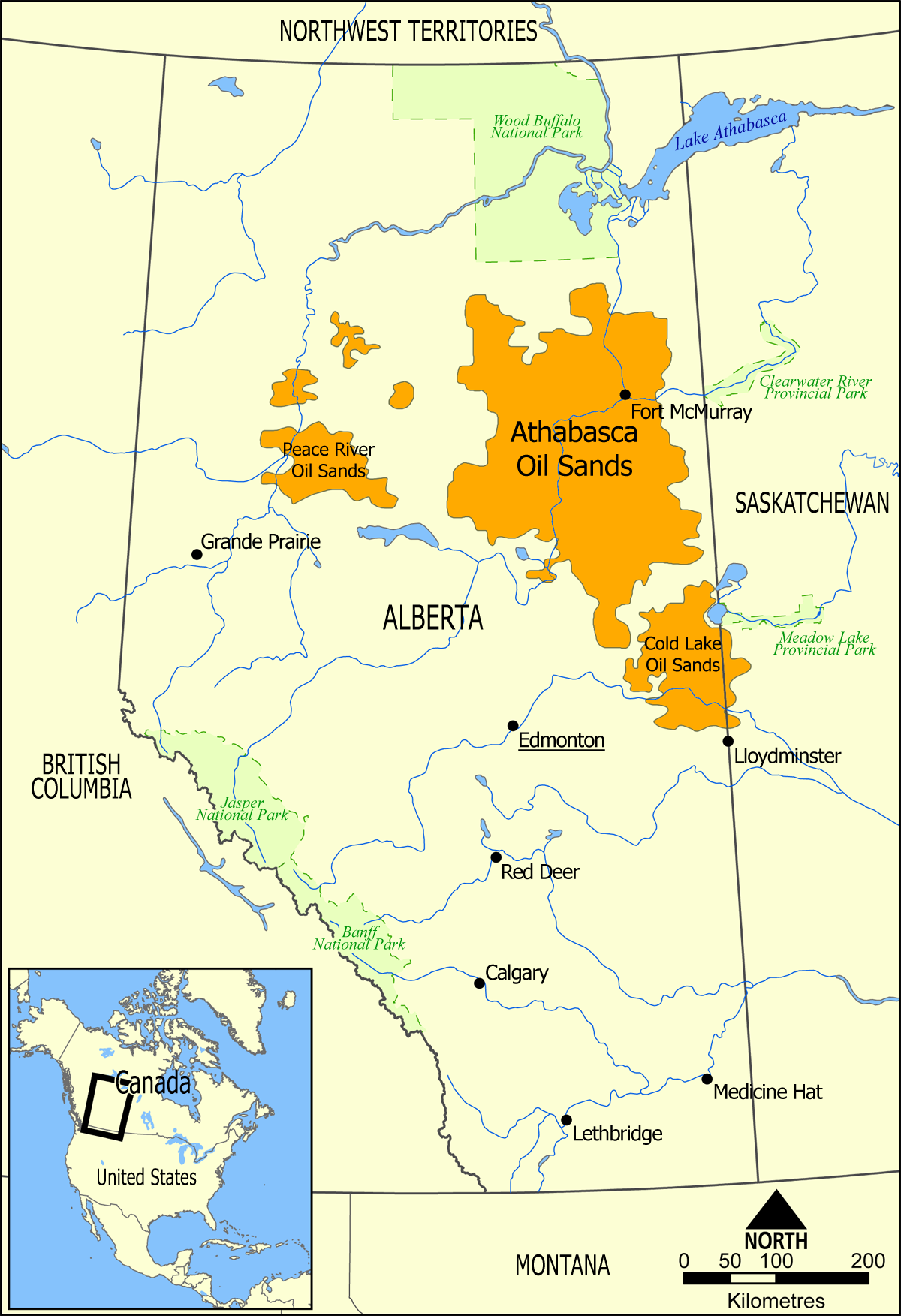

- Location of the Kearl Oil Sands Project
- Country: Canada
- Region: Alberta
- Location: Western Canadian Sedimentary Basin
- Offshore/onshore: Onshore, unconventional
- Coordinates: 57.29524°N 111.24644°W
- Partners: ExxonMobil; Imperial Oil

The Kearl Oil Sands Project is an oil sands mine in the Athabasca Oil Sands region at the Kearl Lake area, about 70 kilometres (43 mi) north of Fort McMurray in Alberta, Canada that is operated Imperial Oil Limited. Kearl is owned by Imperial Oil (70%) and ExxonMobil(30%).

== Ownership ==
Since its first announcement in 2003, the megaproject jointly owned by Imperial Oil and ExxonMobil, but was controlled by Exxon, who owns 69% of Imperial Oil's shares. In 1997, Exxon submitted Kearl's initial public disclosure.

In 2009, ExxonMobil owned 30% of the Kearl Oil Sands Project in 2009, while Imperial Oil Limited owned 70% of the project.

== Cost of project ==
In 2003, similar projects—which like the one proposed at Kearl included an upgrader capable of turning bitumen into synthetic crude oil—were estimated to cost over CA$5 billion.

By 2007, the estimated cost of the project was CA$7 billion.

The first stage of development as described in 2009, involved capital spending of about CA$8 billion, with the final estimate being highly dependent on the final upgrading option selected.

By 2010, the cost of the Kearl Oil Sands Project was more than CA$8 billion.

By February 2013, Imperial said that the Kearl's first phase would cost CA$12.9 billion, 2 billion more than its previous estimate of 10.9 billion dollars, and 61% more than the original estimate of 8 billion.

== Background ==
The initial public disclosure for the Kearl Oil Sands Project was made in 1997 by ExxonMobil Canada, a subsidiary of ExxonMobil. In November 2003, Imperial Oil submitted the updated project disclosure. Engineering, procurement and construction (EPC) activities were carried out between 2009 and 2012. The first production from the field occurred in April. ExxonMobil initially proposed the Kearl project in 1997.

In 2003, Imperial Oil Ltd. announced plans for a proposed new megaproject at Kearl Lake 60 kilometres (37 mi) north of Fort McMurray, in partnership with its parent company, Exxon. Ralph Klein was then premier of Alberta, and against the backdrop of the invasion of Iraq in March, 2003, there was a boom in megaproject construction.

In 2003, other oil companies were also involved in or considering expansion projects in the oil sands, including Husky, Shell, Canadian Natural Resources Ltd., Nexen Inc. and Encana.

== Potential resources and production ==
Kearl's mining area includes about 4.6 billion barrels (730×10^{6} m^{3}) of bitumen resources. It is anticipated that it will take four decades to recover all the bitumen.

When ExxonMobil proposed the Kearl project in 1997, estimated recoverable bitumen resources were 1.2 to 1.4 billion barrels (220×10^{6} m^{3}). In 2010, the Energy Resources Conservation Board (ERCB) estimated that the actual established reserves at over 5.5 billion barrels (870×10^{6} m^{3}).

In 2003, the estimated daily production was 500,000 barrels per day (79,000 m^{3}/d) which would make Imperial "one of the largest producers of bitumen and synthetic oil".

By 2009, estimates for Kearl's production at the first stage were approximately 110,000-barrel-per-day (17,000 m^{3}/d), with later expansions to more than 300,000 barrels per day (48,000 m^{3}/d).

In June 2013, shortly after Kearl opened, it was producing 40,000-barrel-per-day (6,400 m^{3}/d) and expected to reach 100,000-barrel-per-day (16,000 m^{3}/d) in the summer of 2013.

By 2013, Imperial/Exxon estimated that Kearl production would reach 345,000 barrels per day (54,900 m^{3}/d) by 2020.

Kearl's annual average was 178,000 barrels per day (28,300 m^{3}/d) in 2017.

In 2021, full-year annual production at Kearl reached a record of 263,000 barrels per day (41,800 m^{3}/d) and a monthly record of 332,000 barrels per day (52,800 m^{3}/d) in June, 2021, as several "optimization projects" were completed.

== Project description ==
At a June 2003 Canadian Association of Petroleum Producers (CAPP) conference, investors were told that Kearl would be operational in 2012.

In 2006, the initial phase began with Kiewit Corporation contracted to begin site development.

The development was an open-pit mining operation, developed in three stages. The first phase was completed mid-2013.

It used a froth treatment technology, producing blended bitumen which was transported to the Edmonton area by Enbridge's pipeline system. Diluent was provided from Edmonton through the Inter Pipeline-owned 454 kilometres (282 mi) long, 12 inches (300 mm) diameter pipeline supplying the Athabasca Oil Sands Project. The Kearl oil sands facilities would be connected with this pipeline by a 50 kilometres (31 mi) long new branch.

At the first stage an engineering, procurement, and construction management contract was awarded to AMEC while Fluor Corp. was responsible for the development of infrastructure and facilities.

The development is located on two oil-sands leases.

Imperial holds 100 percent of the mining rights on Leases 6 and 87. Areas deemed suitable for surface mining are primarily in the western part of Lease 6 and the northwestern part of Lease 87 (Imperial Oil, ExxonMobil 2009–07). Lease 36 and 31A, in which ExxonMobil Canada holds 100% of the mining rights.

In January 2013, Alberta Federation of Labour president, Gil McGowan, raised concerns that the decision to pipe diluted bitumen south for upgrading instead of including an upgrader as had been announced previously, would result in fewer jobs in Alberta at a time when unemployment had increased in the province. The oil sands was negatively affected, with the number of people applying for employment insurance (EI) in Fort McMurray tripling in a 12-month period. Imperial Oil responded that they would be creating 100s of long-term, and thousands of short-term jobs with an eventual 1,000 people in the permanent workforce.

In 2017, Imperial Oil reported Kearl averaging 178,000 barrels per day (28,300 m^{3}/d), and Imperial Oil and Exxon began a three-year CA$560 million project to boost production by adding additional "crushing capacity and flow distribution".

== Related pipelines ==
In July 2013, the largest pipeline company in Canada, Enbridge announced its 345 kilometres (214 mi) CA$1.3 billion Woodland Pipeline Extension Project to serve the Kearl oil sands project.

== Regulatory agencies ==
In June 2008, Imperial/Exxon received government regulatory approval for the Kearl Oil Sands Project from the Energy Resources Conservation Board (ERCB).

Prior to 2013, Kearl Oil Sands Project was regulated by the now defunct, ERCB—replaced in 2013 by the Alberta Energy Regulator (AER) by then Conservative Premier Allison Redford. The AER—which was fully funded by the industry—became the single regulator in the province, integrating environmental regulation with economic development in all provincial energy projects. The first AER chair was the founding president of the Canadian Association of Petroleum Producers (CAPP).

== Environmental concerns ==
In 2003, Imperial's executive K.C. Williams expressed concerns about the cost of maintaining compliance with environmental laws after the revision of the Kyoto Protocol in 2012, however many other industry executives, including Gwyn Morgan, "one of the oil patch's most vocal Kyoto opponents", were less concerned due to laws passed by the federal government that "limited the volume and cost for energy firms to reduce emissions". In 2012, Canada withdrew from the Kyoto Protocol.

The Pembina Institute, Sierra Club of Canada, the Toxics Watch Society of Alberta and the Prairie Acid Rain Coalition launched legal action in Edmonton to challenge the 2006 regulatory approval of the project. They claimed that the joint federal-Alberta regulatory panel failed to do its job when it gave conditional approval to the Kearl open-pit mine. They argued that a full environmental review must take place before the federal government decides whether the project should proceed.

After a joint federal-provincial panel reviewed and upheld the original decision, a water permit was reinstated in 2008, pending approval from Imperial's board of directors. Delayed again in response to the 2008 fall in oil prices, Imperial Oil decided in May 2009 to proceed with the project, taking advantage of the local economy to cut costs.

On February 6th, 2023, the Alberta Energy Regulator (AER) issued an Environmental Protection Order under the Environmental Protection and Enhancement Act in response to two incidents, including a seepage event reported on May 19, 2022 and an overflow event on February 4, 2023. In March 2023, Imperial Oil received a Fisheries Act direction from Environment and Climate change Canada to contain seepage from a tailings pond at the project, as the seepage has been ruled harmful to wildlife. The spill had first been noticed in May 2022, but Imperial had failed to give the required notification to federal regulators at the time. In response to regulatory requirements, Imperial Oil has been working on remediation which as of February 2024 remains ongoing

== South Korean-made oil extraction modules ==
The Kearl project faced a number of delays and cost escalations, due in part to complications associated with the 2011 and 2012 "Kearl Module Transportation Project" (KMTP) in which enormous, South Korean-made oil extraction modules had to be transported across northwestern states with considerable opposition from residents in Idaho and Montana. Imperial/Exxon lost a battle against Idaho and Montana residents who opposed the transport of megaloads of the modules on their highways, forcing Imperial/Exxon to take the 200 modules apart and to use an alternate route, requiring hundreds of workers and delaying the project. This along with other factors added CA$2 billion dollars to the cost of the project. KMTP consisted of two hundred 210 feet (64 m)-long, 24 feet (7.3 m)-wide, 30 feet (9.1 m)-high vehicles carrying South Korean-made oil extraction modules that weigh nearly 335,000 pounds (152,000 kg) travelling for seven to ten days from the Port of Vancouver in Washington, through Idaho, then Lolo Pass, through Montana's secondary highways on their way to Kearl Oil Sands Project in northern Alberta. The KMTP involved constructing 75 roadway turnouts, bridge reinforcement, and relocating traffic signals and overhead wires along the 480 kilometres (300 mi) route.

In order to transport the modules, Class 8 Tractors hauled 16 feet (4.9 m) wide Mammoet-built Hydraulic Platform Trailers, from the port of Lewiston, Idaho, through the U.S. states of Idaho and Montana to the Kearl Oil Sands Project.

In April 2010, the Montana Department of Transportation (MDT) called for a public meeting to consult with communities that would be affected by the proposed KMTP. In September 2010, residents of Idaho and Montana criticized the KMTP route which included U.S. Route 12 along the narrow curving byways of the Clearwater and Lochsa River of the National Wild and Scenic Rivers System out of concerns for the environment and for the adventure cycling routes.

In December 2010, both Canadian and American unions questioned why Imperial Oil/ExxonMobil chose to give a CA$250 million contract to SungJin Geotec in South Korea to build 200 of the 600 oil extraction modules of equipment for the Kearl oil sands recovery processing. Ironworkers' Local 720's Harry Tostowaryk in Edmonton had no sympathy for Imperial Oil/ExxonMobil's plight as the 200 SungJin modules remained stuck in ports in Lewiston, Idaho and Vancouver, Washington. Tostowaryk said that in the area around Edmonton there were many module facilities sitting idle. With 400 modules either already built or under construction in Edmonton, Tostowaryk rejected Imperial Oil/ExxonMobil's explanations for not making all the modules in Edmonton, as "disjointed", while Cynthia Bergman and Imperial oil's Edmonton-based Bob Delaney claimed factors such as "total value" and competitiveness motivated the outsourcing of labor.

== Coronavirus outbreak ==
On April 15, 2020, an outbreak of COVID-19 was linked to Kearl by the provincial government, and by April 20, at least twenty cases were attributed to the site by Alberta Health Services. On April 18, BC's Interior Health and the Saskatchewan Health Authority (in particular, residents of northwest Saskatchewan) issued advisories of self-isolation for staff returning from interprovincial travel to the region and their close contacts.
