= Drying agent =

Drying agent may refer to:

- Desiccant, which absorbs water or moisture from its vicinity
- Oil drying agent, which speed up the hardening of oils, often used in painting
