= List of largest dams =

The following table lists the largest man-made dams by volume of fill/structure. A dam is generally defined as a barrier that impounds water or underground flows, so tailings dams are relegated to a separate list. Data on volume of structure is not as readily available or reliable as data on dam height and reservoir volume.

Type: TE - Earth; ER - Rock-fill; PG - Concrete gravity; CFRD - Concrete face rockfill

Rank	Name	Country	Year completed	Structure volume (10^{6} m^{3})	Structure height (m)	Reservoir volume (10^{9} m^{3})	Installed capacity (MW)	Type
1	Tarbela Dam	Pakistan	1976	153	143	13.7	4,888	TE/ER
2	Grand Ethiopian Renaissance Dam	Ethiopia	2023	130 (est.)	155	74	5,150 (full)	CFRD
3	Fort Peck Dam	United States	1940	96	76.4	23	185	TE
4	Atatürk Dam	Turkey	1990	84.5	166	48.7	2,400	TE/ER
5	Houtribdijk	Netherlands	1968	78	13	2	0	TE/ER
6	Oahe Dam	United States	1963	70.3	75	29	786	TE/ER
7	Mangla Dam	Pakistan	1967	65.4	147	9.12	1,000	TE/ER
8	Gardiner Dam	Canada	1967	65.4	64	9.4	186	TE
9	Oroville Dam	United States	1968	59.6	230	4.36	819	TE/ER
10	San Luis Dam (BF Sisk Dam)	United States	1967	59.6	93	2.52	424	TE
11	Nurek Dam	Tajikistan	1980	54	300	10.5	3,200	TE
12	Samara Dam	Russia	1955	54	52	57.3	2,315	TE/ER
13	Garrison Dam	United States	1954	50.8	64	29	583.3	TE
14	Cochiti Dam	United States	1975	50.2	76.5	0.73	NA	TE
15	Aswan Dam	Egypt	1970	44.3	111	169	2,100	TE/ER
16	W. A. C. Bennett Dam	Canada	1968	43.7	186	7.4	2,876	TE
17	San Roque Dam	Philippines	2003	40	200	0.835	345	CFRD
18	Fort Randall Dam	United States	1953	38.2	50.3	6.7	320	TE/ER
19	Afsluitdijk	Netherlands	1932	36.5	13	5.5	0	TE/ER
20	Guri Dam	Venezuela	1978	29.8	162	135	10,235	PG/ER
21	Three Gorges Dam	China	2008	27.4	181	39.3	22,500	PG
22	Belo Monte Dam	Brazil	2016	25.4	90	1.9	11,233	PG/ER
23	Itaipu Dam	Brazil; Paraguay	1984	12.8	196	29	14,000	PG
24	Grand Coulee Dam	United States	1942	9.2	168	12	6,809	PG

== List of largest tailings dams ==
Type: TE - Earth; ER - Rock-fill; PG - Concrete gravity; CFRD - Concrete face rockfill.

Rank	Name	Country	Year completed	Structure volume [10^{6} m^{3}]	Structure height [m]	Reservoir volume [10^{9} m^{3}]	Installed capacity [MW]	Type
1	Syncrude Tailings Dam	Canada	1995	540/720	88	0.35	NA	TE
2	Syncrude South West Sand Storage	Canada	2010	119	40–50	0.25	NA	TE
3	ASARCO Mission Mine Tailings Dam	United States	1972	40.1	30	0	NA	ER

== See also ==
- List of reservoirs by volume
- List of tallest dams
- List of conventional hydroelectric power stations
- List of largest hydroelectric power stations
- List of megaprojects § Dam and hydroelectric projects
