= Reid vapor pressure =

Measure of the volatility of gasoline and other petroleum products

Reid vapor pressure (RVP) is a common measure of the volatility of gasoline and other petroleum products. It is defined as the vapor pressure exerted by the vapor of the liquid and any dissolved gases/moisture at 37.8 °C (100 °F) as determined by the test method ASTM-D-323, which was first developed in 1930 and has been revised several times (the latest version is ASTM D323-15a). The test method measures the vapor pressure of gasoline, volatile crude oil, aviation gasoline, naphtha, and other volatile petroleum products but is not applicable for liquefied petroleum gases. ASTM D323-15a requires that the sample be chilled to 0 to 1 °C (32 to 34 °F), air-saturated at this temperature and then poured into the apparatus; for any material that solidifies at this temperature, this step cannot be performed. RVP is commonly reported in kilopascals (kPa) or pounds per square inch (psi) and represents volatization at atmospheric pressure because ASTM-D-323 measures the gauge pressure of the sample in a non-evacuated chamber.

The matter of vapor pressure is important relating to the function and operation of gasoline-powered, especially carbureted, vehicles and is also important for many other reasons. High levels of vaporization are desirable for winter starting and operation and lower levels are desirable in avoiding vapor lock during summer heat. Fuel cannot be pumped when there is vapor in the fuel line (summer) and winter starting will be more difficult when liquid gasoline in the combustion chambers has not vaporized. Thus, oil refineries manipulate the Reid vapor pressure seasonally specifically to maintain gasoline engine reliability.

The Reid vapor pressure (RVP) can differ substantially from the true vapor pressure (TVP) of a liquid mixture, since (1) RVP is the vapor pressure measured at 37.8 °C (100 °F) and the TVP is a function of the temperature; (2) RVP is defined as being measured at a vapor-to-liquid ratio of 4:1, whereas the TVP of mixtures can depend on the actual vapor-to-liquid ratio; (3) RVP will include the pressure associated with the presence of dissolved water and air in the sample (which is excluded by some but not all definitions of TVP); and (4) the RVP method is applied to a sample which has had the opportunity to volatilize somewhat prior to measurement: i.e., the sample container is required to be only 70-80% full of liquid (so that whatever volatilizes into the container headspace is lost prior to analysis); the sample then again volatilizes into the headspace of the D323 test chamber before it is heated to 37.8 degrees Celsius.

== See also ==
- Crude oil assay
