= K factor (crude oil refining) =

The K factor or characterization factor is defined from Rankine boiling temperature °R=1.8Tb[k] and relative to water density ρ at 60°F:

K(UOP) = $\sqrt[3]{1.8Tb} / \rho$

The K factor is a systematic way of classifying a crude oil according to its paraffinic, naphthenic, intermediate or aromatic nature. 12.5 or higher indicate a crude oil of predominantly paraffinic constituents, while 10 or lower indicate a crude of more aromatic nature. The K(UOP) is also referred to as the UOP K factor or just UOPK.

== See also ==
- Crude oil assay
