= PONA number =

The PONA number is an index for oil components used to determine the paraffins (P), olefins (O), naphthenes (N) and aromatics (A) content of FCC (fluid catalytic cracking) and coker (visbreaker) gasoline.

The PONA number plays a significant role in determining the quality of naphtha. Various grades of naphtha are produced depending on the PONA specifications, such as 60/15, 65/12, 70/10, etc. The first number represents the minimum allowable total parafins percentage and the second number specifies the maximum allowable aromatics percentage. It also determines the price of naphtha in international markets.

== See also ==
- Crude oil assay
- SARA
