= Oil drying agent =

Painting implement

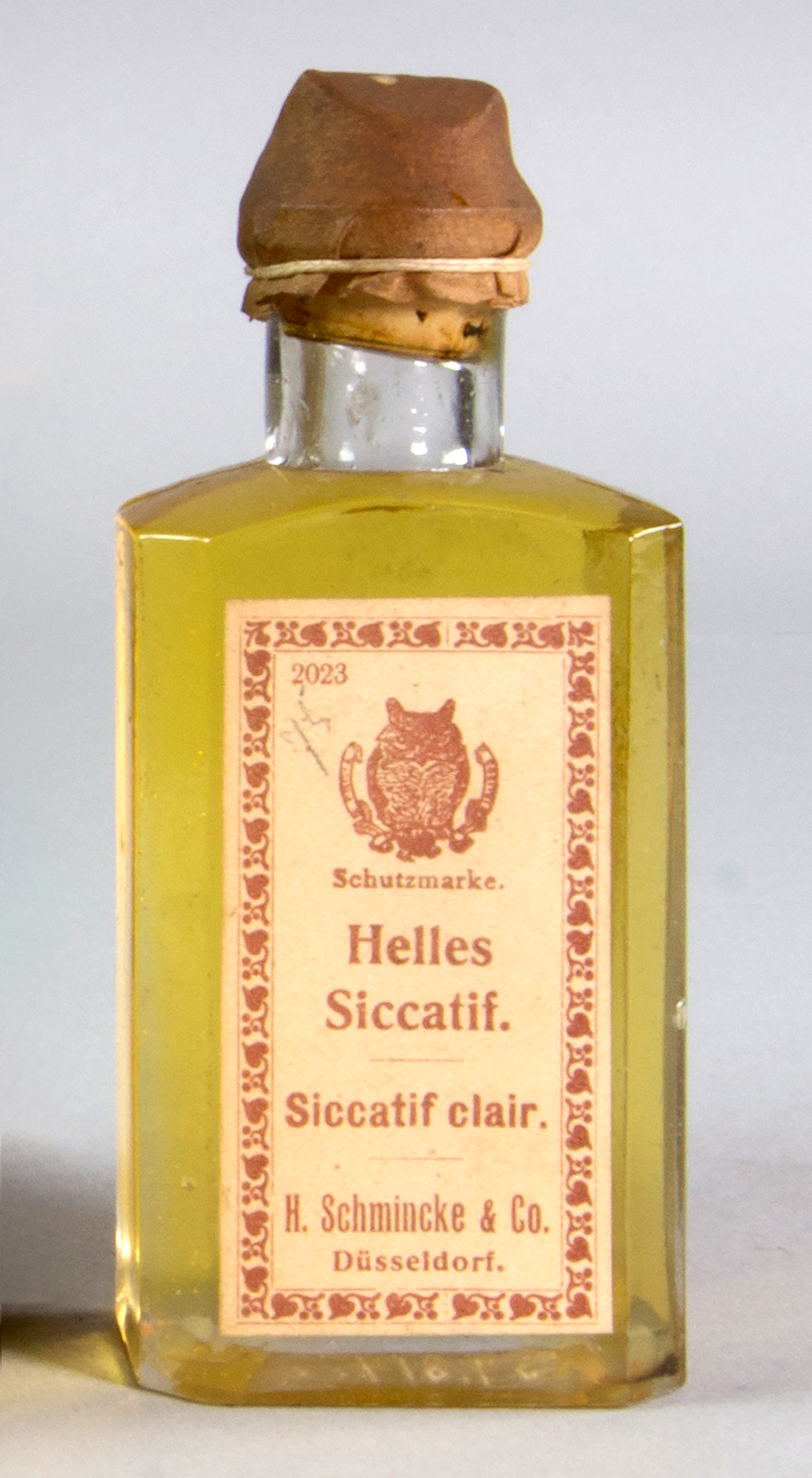
A bottle of siccative from around 1920, belonging to Julius Kronberg.

An oil drying agent, also known as siccative, is a coordination compound that accelerates (catalyzes) the hardening of drying oils, often as they are used in oil-based paints. This so-called drying (actually a chemical reaction that produces an organic plastic) occurs through free-radical chemical crosslinking of the oils. The catalysts promote this free-radical autoxidation of the oils with air.

== Varieties of drying agents ==
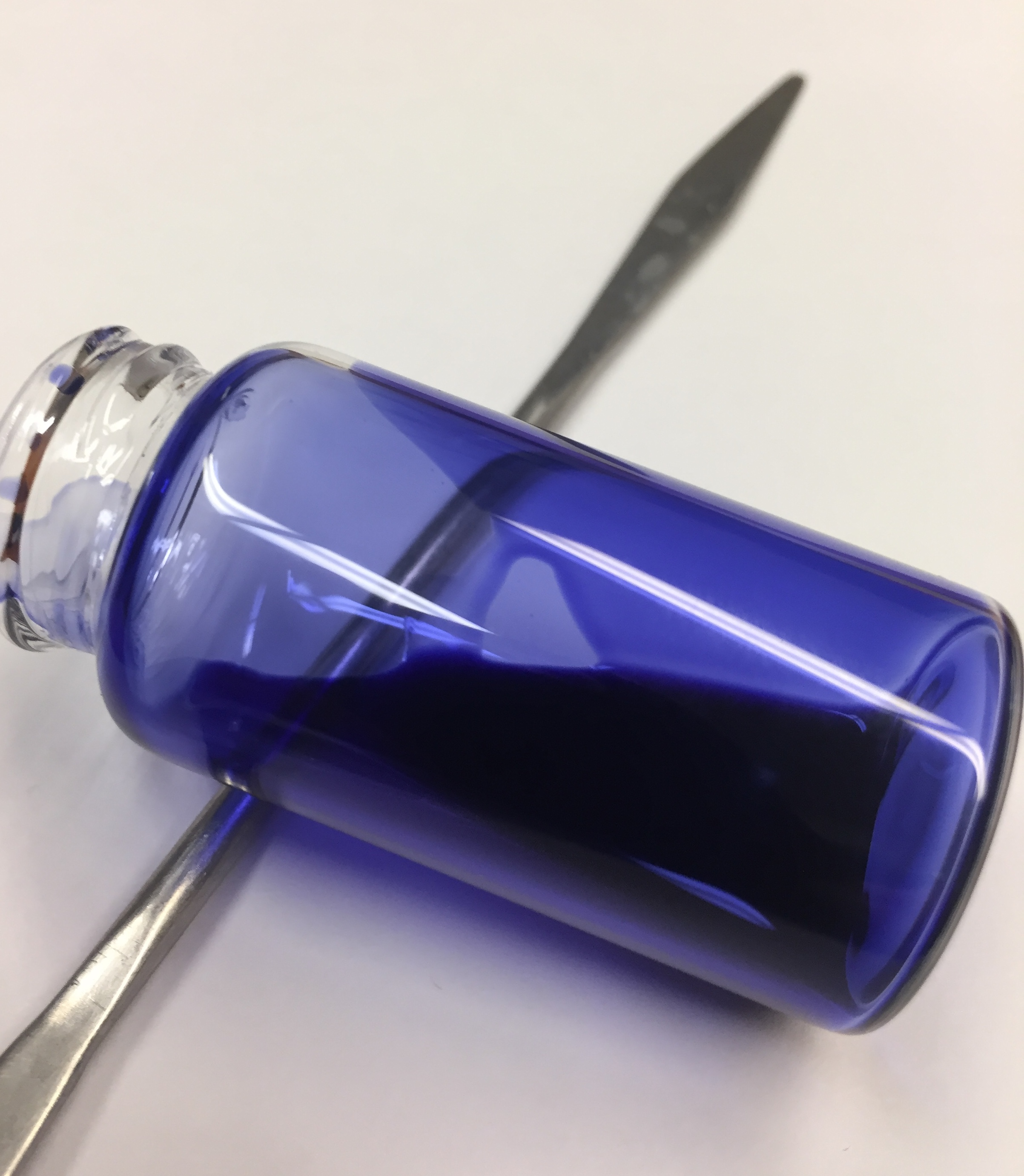
65% Solution of cobalt(II) bis(2-ethylhexanoate) in mineral spirits, a typical drying agent.

Typical oil drying agents are derived from ions of cobalt, manganese, and iron, prepared from lipophilic carboxylic acids such as naphthenic acids, ethylhexanoates, and fatty acids. Formally, they are classified as metallic soaps. Often they are highly oil-soluble. Some are even viscous liquids.

Traditionally, drying agents contained lead, but due to lead's toxicity, cobalt and other elements, such as zirconium, zinc, calcium, and iron, have become more popular. Most driers are colorless but cobalt driers are a deep blue purple color and iron driers are reddish orange. These colored driers are therefore compatible only with certain darker pigmented paints where their color will be unseen.

Japan drier is a common lay term and generic product name for any oil drying agent that can be mixed with drying oils such as boiled linseed oil and alkyd resin paints to speed up "drying". The name refers to "japanning", a term for the use of drying oils as an imitation or substitution for urushiol based Japanese lacquer.

Separate drying additives for paints became necessary as zinc oxide-based paints were developed as an alternative to the lead oxide paints ("white lead") that had been previously used. Zinc oxide paints were developed in parallel with the introduction of "oil soluble driers" or "terebines" around 1885. These were lead and manganese soaps of linseed fatty acids or resin, also termed lineolates or resinates. Terebines had poor shelf life in mixed paints, as they auto-oxidised and lost their effectiveness. As a result, early factory-mixed paints, unless fresh, were a poor substitute for fresh paint mixed by a painter on site from raw ingredients. This situation lasted until the late 1940s; by then further drier developments had superseded the terebines. In 1925, stable napthenate driers were developed in Germany and commercialised in the US in the early 1930s, in parallel with the development of durable and fast-drying alkyd resin enamels. In the 1950s, metallo-organics based on synthetic acids were introduced as driers.

An early work on the drying oils and oil drying agents was by Andés (1901).

== Antiskinning ==
Premature hardening of paint, called "skinning" because it forms a skin on the surface of the paint, can be inhibited by the addition of volatile ligands. These ligands bind to the oil drying agents, then lose their inhibiting action as they themselves slowly volatilize and leave the drying agent to work. One such inhibitor is methylethyl ketone oxime (MEKO), which is called an "antiskinning agent".
