= Saturate, aromatic, resin and asphaltene =

Analysis method for crude oil components

Saturate, aromatic, resin and asphaltene (SARA) is an analysis method that divides crude oil components according to their polarizability and polarity. This method is useful for characterizing heavy oil. A sample is separated into smaller fractions, each with a different composition.

The saturate fraction consists of nonpolar material including linear, branched, and cyclic saturated hydrocarbons (paraffins). Aromatics, which contain one or more aromatic rings, are slightly more polarizable. The remaining two fractions, resins and asphaltenes, have polar substituents. The distinction between the two is that asphaltenes are insoluble in an excess of heptane (or pentane) whereas resins are miscible with heptane (or pentane).

Another name in use for SARA is Asphaltene, Wax/Hydrate Deposition analysis.

== Method description ==
There are three main methods to obtain SARA results. One technology is known as the Iatroscan TLC-FID, and it combines thin-layer chromatography (TLC) with flame ionization detection (FID). It is referred to as IP-143. Other analysis giving SARA numbers might not correspond to the numbers obtained in IP-143. It is therefore always important to know the analysis method when comparing SARA numbers.

TLC-FID is the only method that is 100 times more sensitive than any of the older methods and faster, taking 30 seconds for 1 sample instead of 1 day. In comparison, IP-143 method can take up to 3 days, and it does not offer any analytical precision.

== See also ==
- Crude oil assay
- PONA number
- PIONA
- PNA analysis

== Bibliography ==
- Hsu, C. S., Robinson, P. R. (2019). "Petroleum Science and Technology". Crude Assay and Physical Properties. Springer International Publishing. pp. 19–37. doi:10.1007/978-3-030-16275-7_2. ISBN 978-3-030-16274-0.
