= Syncrude Tailings Dam =

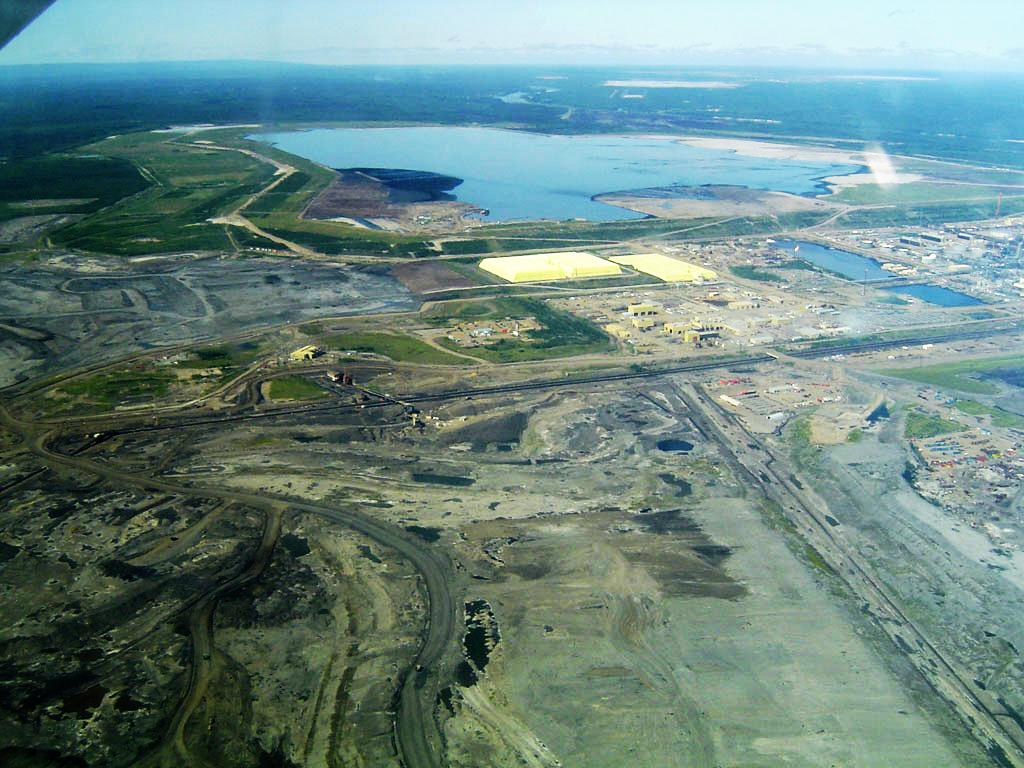
- Syncrude Tailings Dam – Mildred Lake Settling Basin, enclosing tailings pond
- Interactive map of Syncrude Tailings Dam
- Official name: Syncrude Tailings Dam
- Location: Fort McMurray, Alberta, Canada
- Coordinates: 57.057°N 111.600°W
- Construction began: 1978
- Operator: Syncrude Canada Ltd.

Dam and spillways
- Height: 133 to 288 ft (41 to 88 m) (2001)
- Length: 11.3 miles (18.2 km) (2001)

The Syncrude Tailings Dam, impounding the Mildred Lake Settling Basin (MLSB), is an embankment dam that is, by volume of construction material, the largest earth structure in the world in 2001. It is located 40 km (25 mi) north of Fort McMurray, Alberta, Canada, at the northern end of the Mildred Lake lease area owned by Syncrude Canada Ltd. The dam and the tailings reservoir within it are constructed and maintained as part of ongoing operations by Syncrude in extracting oil from the Athabasca oil sands. Other tailings dams constructed and operated in the same area by Syncrude include the Southwest Sand Storage (SWSS), which is the third largest dam in the world by volume of construction material after the Tarbela Dam.

== Oil sands tailings pond water ==
According to Canada’s Oil Sands Innovation Alliance (COSIA), an alliance of oil sands producers formed in 2012, who share research on Environmental Priority Areas (EPAs) such as tailing pond water and greenhouse gases, "Tailings are the sand, silt, clay, soil and water found naturally in oil sands that remain following the mining and bitumen extraction process." The Clark Hot Water Extraction (CHWE) process used by Suncor and Syncrude in their open-pit mining operations, to extract bitumen from the Athabasca Oil Sands (AOS) produces large quantities of tailings pond sludge which remains stable for decades. By 1990 it was considered to be the "imminent environmental constraint to future use of the hot water process." Oil sands tailings pond water contains toxic chemicals such as "naphthenic acids (NAs) and process chemicals (e.g., alkyl sulphates, quaternary ammonium compounds, and alkylphenol ethoxylates)."

== Other Syncrude tailings dams ==
By 2012 Syncrude Canada Ltd had oilsands mining operations on three lease areas (Mildred Lake, Aurora North and Aurora South), all about 40 km north of Fort McMurray. There are many tailings dams on those leases. The lease that has the greatest number of tailings dams, and the largest tailings dams, is the Mildred Lake lease. According to Syncrude's 2010 Baseline Report submitted to the Energy Resources Conservation Board (since replaced by the Alberta Energy Regulator (AER), the Mildred Lake and Aurora North leases together contain: the Mildred Lake Settling Basin (MLSB), Southwest Sand Storage (SWSS), West In-Pit (WIP), East In-Pit (EIP), Southwest In-Pit (SWIP), Aurora Settling Basin (ASB) and Aurora East Pit Northeast (AEPN-E). Those referred to as "in pit" have only small containing embankments. In Aurora South lease the main tailings dam will be the External Tailings Area (ETA).

By 2016, Syncrude four tailings areas at Aurora North consisted of the out-of-pit Aurora Settling Basin (ASB), in operation since 2000, and three in-pit basins: Aurora East Pit North East (AEPN-E) since 2010, Aurora East Pit North West (AEPN-W) since 2011 (in-pit), and Aurora East Pit South (AEPS) since 2014.

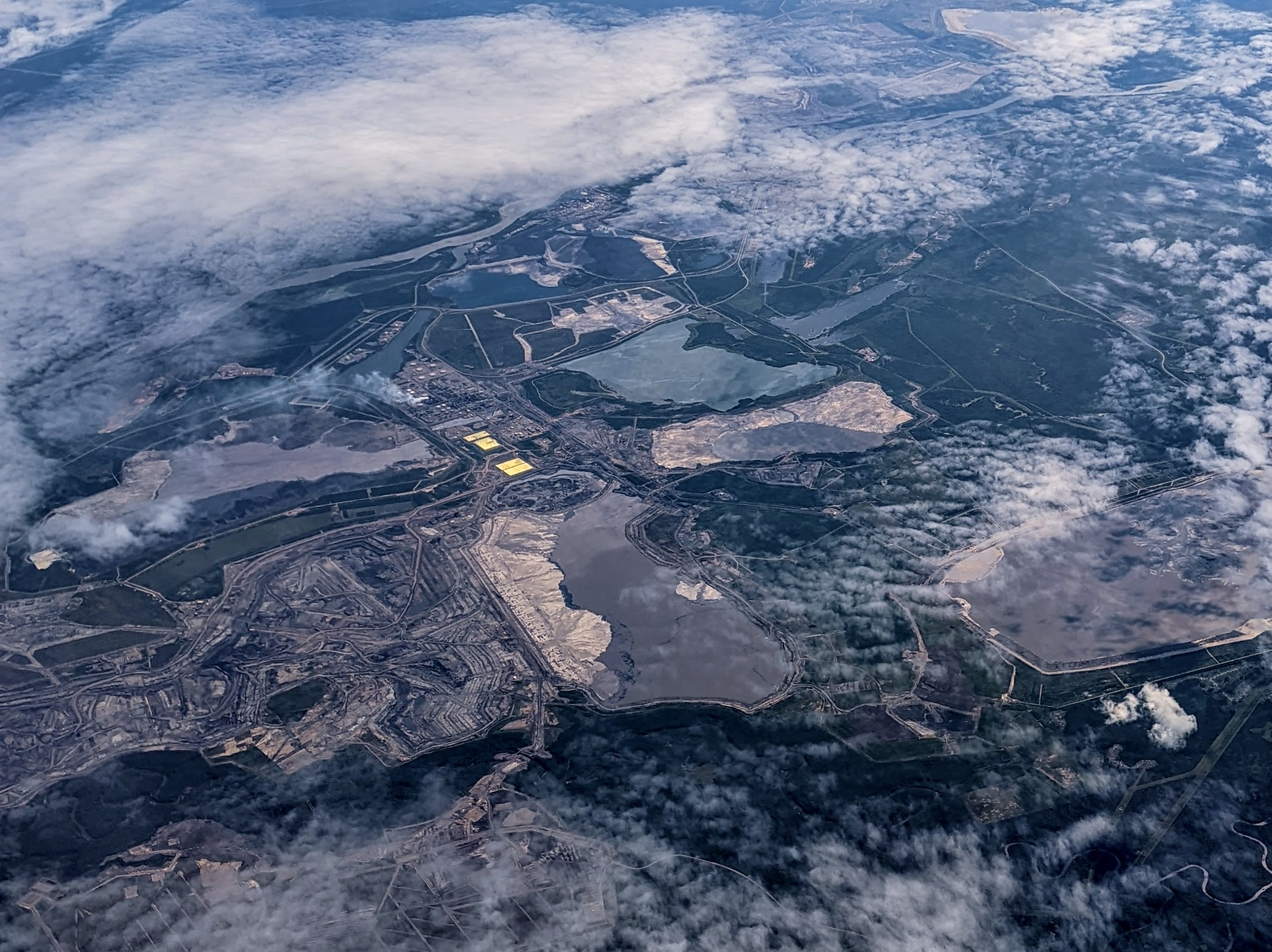
Syncrude's oil sands mine works, Mildred Lake site, with MLSB to the left of the bright yellow sulfur stockpiles

Fluid deposit summary, 30 June 2010
| Site | Facility | Fluid fine tails (10^{6} m^{3}) | Water (10^{6} m^{3}) | Total fluid (10^{6} m^{3}) |
|---|---|---|---|---|
| Mildred Lake | MLSB | 196.5 | 13.4 | 209.9 |
| Mildred Lake | SWSS | 46.3 | 10.1 | 56.4 |
| Mildred Lake | WIP | 168.6 | 22.9 | 191.5 |
| Mildred Lake | EIP | 0.1 | 2.5 | 2.6 |
| Mildred Lake | SWIP Jr. | 1.2 | 0.3 | 1.5 |
| Mildred Lake | SWIP Major | 13.2 | 28.6 | 41.8 |
| Aurora North | ASB | 76.7 | 48.3 | 125.0 |
| Aurora North | AEPN-E | 0.21 | 0.81 | 1.01 |

== Mildred Lake Settling Basin (MLSB) ==
The Mildred Lake Settling Basin is located on the north side of the Mildred Lake lease area. It is a tailings pond that serves three purposes. Firstly, the embankment was planned as storage for a substantial volume of sand. Secondly, the basin acts as a storage basin for process water, which is recycled, with a planned ultimate storage capacity of 350×10^{6} m^{3}. Thirdly, the fines that are not captured elsewhere settle and compact in the basin, and are later pumped out for long term storage. This means that the MLSB is a true dam in the sense that it is filled with water in the long term, rather than being quickly filled by solids as in many other tailings dams. The embankment has a circumference of about 18 km, an average height of about 40 m and a maximum height of about 88 m.

Two starter dams were constructed during 1976 to 1978 and were required until sufficient sand was available for building the embankments. The north starter dam had a crest elevation of 312 m. The original ground surface varied from 294 m to 305 m while up to 1.5 m of original ground was stripped for a trench above which was a compacted clay core. The crest width was 30 metres.

The main embankment was taken to a final elevation of 352 m for more than half of its length by 1994 and completed in 1995. For construction purposes the embankment was considered to be in a collection of 30 "cells", each with a crest length of about 600 metres. Acceptable side slopes were determined on a cell-by-cell basis, based on the strength of available materials and foundation movement. The slope of the outer part of the embankment is much smaller than that of the inner part, in a ratio of about 4:1. By 1997 Syncrude's large open-pit operations were producing up to 250,000 tons a day of tailings that were collected in this tailings pond built on the upstream construction method.

As this dam frequently appears in lists as the largest dam structure in the world, it is necessary to estimate the accuracy of the quoted volume of construction material. The quoted length of the embankment of 18 km is reliable. The average height of the embankment is quoted to be 40 m, and a check on this using four cross sections yields 45 m, which is of the same order of magnitude. The average base width of the embankment is variously 1,800 m, 800 m from Google Earth and 660 m. So whereas one report gives an embankment volume of 720×10^{6} m^{3}, calculations based on the width of the embankment base from these three sources give embankment volumes of 660, 290 and 240×10^{6} m^{3} respectively. So there's some uncertainty as to the total volume of construction material.

== South West Sand Storage (SWSS) ==
The SWSS facility is located in the southwest corner of the Mildred Lake lease area. It was commissioned in 1993. The facility was designed to provide coarse tailings sand storage, returning water and thin fine tailings to other sites within the Mildred Lake Project area. The crest elevation is 400 m or 390 m. An upgrade to increase the water storage to a maximum water surface level of 397 m was constructed in 2009 to 2010.

The embankment length is 19.5 km. The maximum embankment height is at least 30 m and the average embankment height is about 18.5 m. The average embankment base width is about 800 m from Google Earth. So the total embankment volume is about 145×10^{6} m^{3}.

== Aurora Settling Basin (ASB) ==
This is located to the South East of the Aurora North lease, adjacent to the Muskeg River.

The embankment length is 11.6 km and the average embankment base width is about 260 m from Google Earth. The surface elevation is 341.4 m.

== See also ==
- Syncrude Canada Ltd.
- Athabasca Oil Sands
- List of largest dams in the world
- List of articles about Canadian oil sands
