= True vapor pressure =

True vapor pressure (TVP) is a common measure of the volatility of petroleum distillate fuels. It is defined as the equilibrium partial pressure exerted by a volatile organic liquid as a function of temperature as determined by the test method ASTM D 2879.

The true vapor pressure (TVP) at 100 °F differs slightly from the Reid vapor pressure (RVP) (per definition also at 100 °F), as it excludes dissolved fixed gases such as air. Conversions between the two can be found in AP 42, Fifth Edition, Volume I Chapter 7: Liquid Storage Tanks (p 7.1-54 and onwards)
