= Syncrude =

Canadian producer of synthetic crude oil

Syncrude Canada Ltd.
- Type: Joint Venture
- Industry: Petroleum
- Founded: December 1964; 61 years ago
- Headquarters: Quarry Park, Calgary, Alberta
- Products: synthetic crude oil
- Owner: Imperial Oil; Nexen; Sinopec; Suncor Energy
- Number of employees: 5,600 (2009)
- Website: syncrude.ca

Syncrude Canada Ltd. is one of the world's largest producers of synthetic crude oil from oil sands and the largest single source producer in Canada. It is located just outside Fort McMurray in the Athabasca Oil Sands, and has a nameplate capacity of 350,000 barrels per day (56,000 m^{3}/d) of oil, equivalent to about 13% of Canada's consumption. It has approximately 5.1 billion barrels (810,000,000 m^{3}) of proven and probable reserves (11.9 billion when including contingent and prospective resources) situated on 8 leases over 3 contiguous sites. Including fully realized prospective reserves, current production capacity could be sustained for well over 90 years.

As of 2021, Syncrude's Mildred Lake site remains the largest single greenhouse gas emitter in Canada.

== History ==
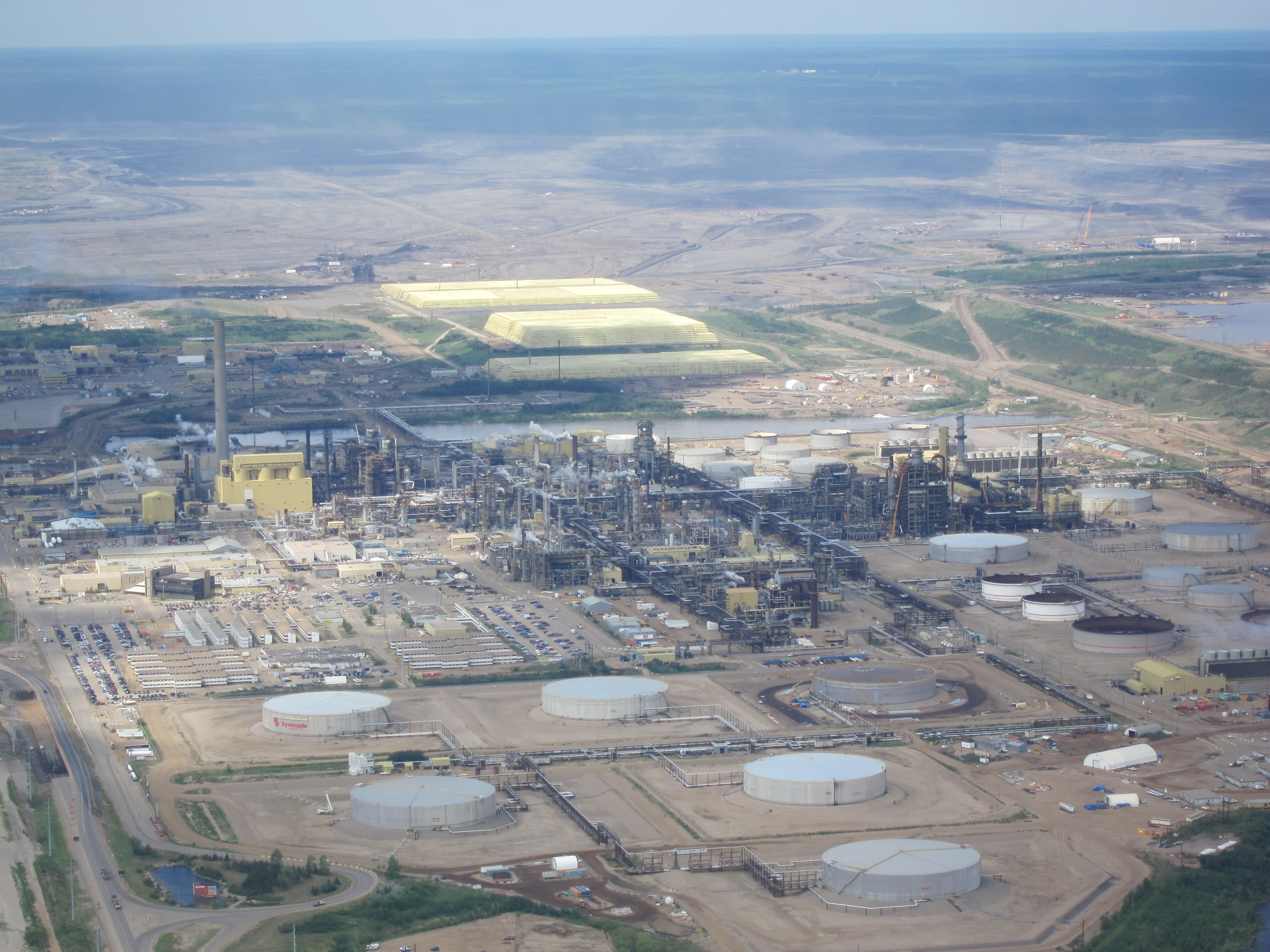
Minesite at Syncrude's Mildred Lake plant

Syncrude was formed as a research consortium in 1964 by Ryan Sheppard. Construction at the Syncrude site began in 1973, and it officially opened in 1978. The plant cost 2 billion dollars, and benefited from a bailout by the Canadian government.

Starting in 1996, Syncrude has been expanding its operations. Between 1996 and 1999, the original mine was expanded and the plant was "debottlenecked", increasing production from 73.5 million barrels (11,690,000 m^{3}) per year in 1996 to 81.4 million in 1999. The total cost of this stage of expansion was $470 million. Between 1998 and 2001, a new mine, Aurora, was opened 35 km north of the original site, and further debottlenecking was undertaken. Production started in Aurora in July 2001. Syncrude's production increased to 90 million barrels (14,000,000 m^{3}) per year by the end of 2001. Total cost for this stage was $1 billion.

A third stage of expansion was undertaken between 2001 and 2006, in which a second train at the Aurora line came online and the Mildred Lake upgrader was expanded. The expansion added 100,000 barrels per day (16,000 m^{3}/d) to Syncrude's production (36.5 million barrels (5,800,000 m^{3}) a year assuming this is average). The cost was $8.4 billion, a substantial cost overrun over the original estimate of $5.7 billion.

On April 12, 2010, ConocoPhillips agreed to sell its share to Sinopec, a Chinese state-owned oil company. The sale, for $4.65 billion, was completed on June 25, 2010.

The ninth tallest smokestack in Canada, at 183 metres (600 ft), is located at its Mildred Lake facility.

In April 2016, Murphy Oil agreed to sell its five per cent share to Suncor, for $937 million. This followed the hostile takeover of Canadian Oil Sands less than a year earlier, and increased its interest in Syncrude from just under 49 per cent to nearly 54 per cent, making it the majority shareholder of the project.

The 2016 Fort McMurray wildfire forced a complete shutdown of Syncrude's facilities.

=== Ownership ===
The company is a joint venture by four partners: Suncor Energy (58.74%), Imperial Oil (25%), Sinopec (9.03%) and CNOOC (7.23%). As a result, Syncrude is not traded directly, but rather through the individual owners.

The ownership board must approve all annual operating budgets and proposed capital spending projects, and are required to provide the funding for said activities based on their ownership share.

== Controversies ==
=== Pollution ===
Air releases of combined gases without volatile organic compounds (VOCs) by Syncrude Canada in 2005 were 129,741,321 (kg) in total, including ammonia (4,302,361 kg), sulphuric acid (1,129,425 kg), xylene (501,461 kg), etc. The company was also ranked as having the seventh highest air releases of combined gases (without VOC) in Canada in 2005. Syncrude's Mildred Lake Plant Site is the largest greenhouse gas emitter in Canada emitting 12,359,420 tonnes of CO_{2} equivalent in 2012. It remains Canada's largest greenhouse-gas emitter in 2021. Research published in 2019 indicated that the intensity of CO_{2} emissions at the Syncrude Mildred Lake site may be 123% larger than calculations from publicly reported data would indicate.

== Oil sands tailings pond water ==
Syncrude is a member of Canada's Oil Sands Innovation Alliance (COSIA), an alliance of oil sands producers formed in 2012, who share research on Environmental Priority Areas (EPAs) such as tailing pond water and greenhouse gases. One of the major challenges facing COSIA is the treatment of oil sands tailings pond water. "Tailings are the sand, silt, clay and water found naturally in oil sands that remain following the mining and bitumen extraction process." The problem stems from the hot water process used by Suncor and Syncrude to extract bitumen from the Athabasca Oil Sands which produce large quantities of tailings pond sludge which remains stable for decades. By 1990 it was considered to be the "imminent environmental constraint to future use of the hot water process." Syncrude also contributes to the industry-funded Joint Oil sands Monitoring Program which was created in 2012 and managed by the federal and Alberta governments. According to a 2013 article published in Environmental Science: Processes & Impacts, the tailings ponds contain toxic chemicals such as "naphthenic acids (NAs) and process chemicals (e.g., alkyl sulphates, quaternary ammonium compounds, and alkylphenol ethoxylates)." The study used the computer program (CXTFIT) to evaluate the transport behaviour of these contaminants through the foundation as well as underground. The chemicals seep "through the foundation of the tailings pond to the subsurface, potentially affecting the quality of groundwater."

In an article accepted for publication in Environmental Science and Technology journal in January 2014, Environment Canada's Richard Frank and his team of scientists confirmed that, using new technology, they were able to "fingerprint the mix of groundwater chemicals in the area" proving that oil sands tailings pond water had leached into groundwater and the Athabasca River. The study undertaken by a new federal-provincial oil sands monitoring program used new $1.6-million technology acquired in 2010. The equipment is able to "fingerprint chemicals and trace them back to where they came from."

=== Greenpeace lawsuit ===
In August 2008, Syncrude Canada filed a lawsuit against Greenpeace Canada for $120,000, plus costs, after 11 Greenpeace activists went on to the company's Aurora North oil sands site July 24, 2008, to unfurl anti-oil sands banners and unsuccessfully block a tailings pipe. Company spokesperson Mark Kruger said the company filed the lawsuit—which also names the activists individually—largely because of safety concerns as the activists were "unfamiliar with an industrial operation, and unfamiliar with some of the safety hazards that can be present... We just want to ensure that, in the future, nobody is putting themselves at unnecessary risk."

Greenpeace chose the Syncrude site for the protest because in April 2008, 1,600 migrating ducks died after landing on a tailings pond at the site (Syncrude was fined $3 million).

== Sponsorships ==
=== Keyano College ===
In 2004, Syncrude announced an $800,000 multi-year donation, $500,000 of which was dedicated to the new community Syncrude Sport and Wellness Centre and the balance to Keyano Theatre’s Arts Alive Series and student scholarships. In 2005, Syncrude invested another $200,000 and took the naming rights to the Syncrude Sports and Wellness Centre at Keyano College.

== See also ==
- Canadian Centre for Energy Information
- History of the petroleum industry in Canada (oil sands and heavy oil)
- Scotford Upgrader
- Suncor
