= Asphaltene =

Heavy organic molecular substances that are found in crude oil

Asphaltenes are molecular substances that are found in crude oil, along with resins, aromatic hydrocarbons, and saturates (i.e. saturated hydrocarbons such as alkanes). The word "asphaltene" was coined by Jean-Baptiste Boussingault in 1837 when he noticed that the distillation residue of some bitumens had asphalt-like properties. Asphaltenes in the form of asphalt or bitumen products from oil refineries are used as paving materials on roads, shingles for roofs, and waterproof coatings on building foundations.

An example of possible structure for an asphaltene molecule.

== Composition ==
Asphaltenes consist primarily of carbon, hydrogen, nitrogen, oxygen, and sulfur, as well as trace amounts of vanadium and nickel. The C:H ratio is approximately 1:1.2, depending on the asphaltene source. Asphaltenes are defined operationally as the n-heptane (C_{7}H_{16})-insoluble, toluene (C_{6}H_{5}CH_{3})-soluble component of a carbonaceous material such as crude oil, bitumen, or coal. Asphaltenes have been shown to have a distribution of molecular masses in the range of 400 u to 1500 u, but the average and maximum values are difficult to determine due to aggregation of the molecules in solution.

== Analysis ==
The molecular structure of asphaltenes is difficult to determine because the molecules tend to stick together in solution. These materials are extremely complex mixtures containing hundreds or even thousands of individual chemical species. Asphaltenes do not have a specific chemical formula: individual molecules can vary in the number of atoms contained in the structure, and the average chemical formula can depend on the source. Although they have been subjected to modern analytical methods, including SARA, mass spectrometry, electron paramagnetic resonance and nuclear magnetic resonance, the exact molecular structures are difficult to determine. Given this limitation, asphaltenes are composed mainly of polyaromatic carbon ring units with oxygen, nitrogen, and sulfur heteroatoms, combined with trace amounts of heavy metals, particularly chelated vanadium and nickel, and aliphatic side chains of various lengths. Many asphaltenes from crude oils around the world contain similar ring units, as well as polar and non-polar groups, which are linked together to make highly diverse large molecules.

Asphaltene after heating have been subdivided as: nonvolatile (heterocyclic N and S species), and, volatile (paraffin + olefins, benzenes, naphthalenes, phenanthrenes, several others). Speight reports a simplified representation of the separation of petroleum into the following six major fractions: volatile saturates, volatile aromatics, nonvolatile saturates, nonvolatile aromatics, resins and asphaltenes. He also reports arbitrarily defined physical boundaries for petroleum using carbon-number and boiling point.

== Geochemistry ==
Asphaltenes are today widely recognised as dispersed, chemically altered fragments of kerogen, which migrated out of the source rock for the oil, during oil catagenesis. Asphaltenes had been thought to be held in solution in oil by resins (similar structure and chemistry, but smaller), but recent data shows that this is incorrect. Indeed, it has recently been suggested that asphaltenes are nanocolloidally suspended in crude oil and in toluene solutions of sufficient concentrations. In any event, for low surface tension liquids, such as alkanes and toluene, surfactants are not necessary to maintain nanocolloidal suspensions of asphaltenes.

The nickel to vanadium ratio of asphaltenes reflect the pH and Eh conditions of the paleo-depositional environment of the source rock for oil (Lewan, 1980;1984), and this ratio is, therefore, in use in the petroleum industry for oil-oil correlation and for identification of potential source rocks for oil exploration.

== Occurrence ==
Heavy oils, oil sands, bitumen and biodegraded oils (as bacteria cannot assimilate asphaltenes, but readily consume saturated hydrocarbons and certain aromatic hydrocarbon isomers – enzymatically controlled) contain much higher proportions of asphaltenes than do medium-API oils or light oils. Condensates are virtually devoid of asphaltenes.

== Measurement ==
Because the ratio of electron spins per gram is constant for a particular species of asphaltene then the quantity of asphaltene in an oil can be determined by measuring its paramagnetic signature (EPR). Measuring the EPR signature of the oil at the wellhead as the oil is produced then gives a direct indication of whether the amount of asphaltene is changing (e.g. because of precipitation or sloughing in the tubing below).

In addition, asphaltene aggregation, precipitation or deposition can sometimes be predicted by modeling or machine learning methods and can be measured in the laboratory using imaging methods or filtration.

== Issues ==
Asphaltenes impart high viscosity to crude oils, negatively impacting production. Furthermore, the variable asphaltene concentration in crude oils within individual reservoirs creates a myriad of production problems.

=== Heat exchanger fouling ===
Asphaltenes, a significant contributor to fouling in the heat exchangers of the crude oil distillation preheat train, are present within micelles in crude oil. These micelles can be broken down by reacting with paraffins at high temperatures. Once the protective micelle is removed, polar asphaltenes aggregate and are transported to the tube walls, where they adhere and form a foulant layer.

=== Asphaltene removal ===
Chemical treatments for removing asphaltene include:

1. Solvents
2. Dispersants/solvents
3. Oil/dispersants/solvents

The dispersant/solvent approach is used for removing asphaltenes from formation minerals. Continuous treating may be required to inhibit asphaltene deposition in the tubing. Batch treatments are common for dehydration equipment and tank bottoms. There are also asphaltene precipitation inhibitors that can be used by continuous treatment or squeeze treatments.

== See also ==
- Tholin
