= Naphthenic acid =

- Example component of naphthenic acid

Identifiers
CAS Number	1338-24-5
ECHA InfoCard	100.014.239
EC Number	215-662-8
PubChem CID	example: 20849290
UNII	YNM5U6B7A4
CompTox Dashboard (EPA)	DTXSID1027394

Properties
Chemical formula	Variable
Molar mass	Variable

Hazards
- GHS labelling
Pictograms	(GHS07: Exclamation mark) (GHS09: Environmental hazard)
Signal word	Warning
Hazard statements	H315, H317, H319, H335, H411
Precautionary statements	P261, P264, P271, P272, P273, P280, P302+P352, P304+P340, P305+P351+P338, P312, P321, P332+P313, P333+P313, P337+P313, P362, P363, P391, P403+P233, P405, P501
Flash point	101 °C (214 °F; 374 K)
- Except where otherwise noted, data are given for materials in their standard state (at 25 °C [77 °F], 100 kPa). Infobox references

Naphthenic acids (NAs) are mixtures of several cyclopentyl and cyclohexyl carboxylic acids with molecular weights of 120 to well over 700 atomic mass units. The main fractions are carboxylic acids with a carbon backbone of 9 to 20 carbons. McKee et al. claim that "naphthenic acids (NAs) are primarily cycloaliphatic carboxylic acids with 10 to 16 carbons", although acids containing up to 50 carbons have been identified in heavy petroleum.

== Nomenclature ==
Naphthenic acid can refer to derivatives and isomers of naphthalene carboxylic acids. In the petrochemical industry, NA's refer to alkyl carboxylic acids found in petroleum. The term naphthenic acid has roots in the somewhat archaic term "naphthene" (cycloaliphatic but non-aromatic) used to classify hydrocarbons. It was originally used to describe the complex mixture of petroleum-based acids when the analytical methods available in the early 1900s could identify only a few naphthene-type components with accuracy. Today "naphthenic" acid is used in a more generic sense to refer to all of the carboxylic acids present in petroleum, whether cyclic, acyclic, or aromatic compounds, and carboxylic acids containing heteroatoms such as N and S. Although commercial naphthenic acids often contain a majority of cycloaliphatic acids, multiple studies have shown they also contain straight chain and branched aliphatic acids and aromatic acids; some naphthenic acids contain >50% combined aliphatic and aromatic acids.

Salts of naphthenic acids, called naphthenates, are widely used as hydrophobic sources of metal ions in diverse applications.

== Classification ==
Naphthenic acids are represented by a general formula C_{n}H_{2n-z}O_{2}, where n indicates the carbon number and z specifies a homologous series. The z is equal to 0 for saturated, acyclic acids and increases to 2 in monocyclic naphthenic acids, to 4 in bicyclic naphthenic acids, to 6 in tricyclic acids, and to 8 in tetracyclic acids. Crude oils with total acid number (TAN) as little as 0.5 mg KOH/g acid or petroleum fractions greater than about 1.0 mg KOH/g oil usually qualify as a high acid crude or oil. At the 1.0 mg/g TAN level, acidic crude oils begin to be heavily discounted in value and so are referred to as opportunity crudes. Commercial grades of naphthenic acid are most often recovered from kerosene/jet fuel and diesel fractions, where their corrosivity and negative impact on burning qualities require their removal. Naphthenic acids are also a major contaminant in water produced during the extraction of oil from Athabasca oil sands.

== Sources and occurrence ==
Naphthenic acids are extracted from petroleum distillates by extraction with aqueous base. Acidification of this extract acidic neutralization returns the acids free from hydrocarbons. Naphthenic acid is removed from petroleum fractions not only to minimize corrosion but also to recover commercially useful products. Some crude oils are high in acidic compounds (up to 4%).

=== Naphthenic acid corrosion ===
The composition varies with the crude oil composition and the conditions during refining and oxidation. Fractions that are rich in naphthenic acids can cause corrosion damage to oil refinery equipment; the phenomenon of naphthenic acid corrosion (NAC). Crude oils with a high content of naphthenic acids are often referred to as high total acid number (TAN) crude oils or high acid crude oil (HAC).

== Rare earth separation ==
Naphthenic acid was first discovered as a method for yttrium extraction from lanthanide elements by the Bureau of Mines in the USA in 1964. The application of naphthenic acid in rare earth separation was identified by the Changchun Institute of Applied Chemistry in 1974. Between 1974 and 1975, the Nanchang 603 Factory collaborated with the Changchun Institute and other units to successfully develop a third-generation extraction process for yttrium oxide. This process, which utilized naphthenic acid for one-step extraction of high-purity yttrium oxide, was put into operation in 1976.

Naphthenic acid has been successfully used in industrial rare earth separation due to its advantages of low cost and abundant availability. In solvent extraction, the H^{+} released from naphthenic acid decrease the aqueous acidity, thereby limiting the positive extraction reaction and leading to an unsatisfied extraction efficient. To address this issue, alkaline substances (bases) are used to saponify naphthenic acid before extraction. This step helps avoid the generation of H^{+}, effectively controlling the equilibrium acidity and improving extraction efficiency. However, this process produces a significant amount of ammonium nitrogen wastewater, which necessitates additional wastewater treatment after extraction. Currently, research is ongoing to minimize the use of bases and maximize separation efficiency, including adding additives and/or ionic liquids.

== Metal naphthenates ==
As the greatest current and historical usage, naphthenic acid are used to produce metal naphthenates. Metal naphthenates are referred often to as "salts" of naphthenic acids, but metal naphthenates are not ionic. They are covalent, hydrophobic coordination complexes. More specifically they are metal carboxylate complexes with the formula M(naphthenate)_{2}, or M_{3}O(naphthenate)_{6} for basic oxides. Metal naphthenates are not well defined in conventional chemical sense because they are a complex mixture rather than a specific single component, structure or formula. They have diverse applications.

The naphthenates have industrial applications including synthetic detergents, lubricants, corrosion inhibitors, fuel and lubricating oil additives, wood preservatives, insecticides, fungicides, acaricides, wetting agents, thickening agent of napalm and oil drying agents used in painting and wood surface treatment. Industrially useful naphthenates include those of aluminium, magnesium, calcium, barium, cobalt, copper, lead, manganese, nickel, vanadium, and zinc. Illustrative is the use of cobalt naphthenate for the oxidation of tetrahydronaphthalene to the hydroperoxide.

The complex mixture and hydrophobic nature of naphthenic acid allows metal naphthenates to be highly soluble in organic media such as petroleum-based hydrocarbons, oftentimes much more so than single isomer carboxylates such as metal acetates and stearates. Their industrial applications exploits this property, where they are used as oil-borne detergents, lubricants, corrosion inhibitors, fuel and lubricating oil additives, wood preservatives, insecticides, fungicides, acaricides, wetting agents, oil drying agents (driers) used in oil-based paint and wood surface treatment including varnish. Industrially useful metal naphthenates include those of aluminum, barium, calcium, cobalt, copper, iron, lead, magnesium manganese, nickel, potassium, vanadium, zinc, and zirconium.

== Environmental impact ==
Naphthenic acids are the major contaminant in water produced from the extraction of oil from Athabasca oil sands (AOS).

It has been stated that "naphthenic acids are the most significant environmental contaminants resulting from petroleum extraction from oil sands deposits." Nonetheless, the same authors suggest that "under worst-case exposure conditions, acute toxicity is unlikely in wild mammals exposed to naphthenic acids in AOS tailings pond water, but repeated exposure may have adverse health effects." Naphthenic acids are present in Athabasca oil sands and tailings pond water at an estimated concentration of 81 mg/L

Using Organisation for Economic Co-operation and Development [OECD] protocols for testing toxicity, refined NAs are not acutely genotoxic to mammals. Damage, however, induced by NAs while transient in acute or discontinuous exposure, may be cumulative in repeated exposure.

Naphthenic acids have both acute and chronic toxicity to fish and other organisms.

== See also ==
- Carboxylic acid
- Organic acid
- Resin acid
- Paraffinic
