= CrystaSulf =

Chemical process

CrystaSulf is the trade name for a chemical process used for removing hydrogen sulfide (H_{2}S) from natural gas, synthesis gas and other gas streams in refineries and chemical plants. CrystaSulf uses a modified liquid-phase Claus reaction to convert the hydrogen sulfide (H_{2}S) into elemental sulfur which is then removed from the process by filtration. CrystaSulf is used in the energy industry as a mid-range process to handle sulfur amounts between 0.1 and 20 short tons (0.091 and 18.144 t) per day. Below 0.1 short tons (0.091 t) of sulfur per day is typically managed by H_{2}S Scavengers and applications above 20 short tons (18 t) per day are typically treated with the Amine – Claus process.

== Process chemistry ==
In the CrystaSulf process, a heavy hydrocarbon liquid is pumped through an absorber where the liquid contacts the gas stream that contains H_{2}S. The H_{2}S is absorbed from the gas stream and the clean gas stream then exits the absorber. The H_{2}S in the liquid reacts with sulfur dioxide (SO_{2}) to form elemental sulfur and water according to the following chemical equation.

2 H_{2}S + SO_{2} → 3 S + 2 H_{2}O

The formed elemental sulfur remains dissolved in the hydrocarbon solution. Since the elemental sulfur remains dissolved, there are no solids, i.e., no slurry, in the absorber section of the process. This eliminates plugging problems that have been documented for aqueous redox processes when operated at high pressures. The SO_{2} that was present in the hydrocarbon solution was added prior to the solution being pumped into the absorber. The SO_{2} is chemically bound in the solution and readily available to react with H_{2}S. The process is operated with an excess amount of SO_{2} in the solution so that there will always be sufficient amount for the liquid phase Claus reaction with H_{2}S.

== Elemental sulfur removal ==
After the dissolved elemental sulfur is formed in the hydrocarbon solution, the liquid is piped from the absorber, through a flash vessel if necessary to lower the operating pressure, and then through a crystallizer. The crystallizer reduces the temperature of the solution and solid sulfur is formed which is removed by a filter.

After the solid sulfur is removed, the hydrocarbon solution is re-heated to approximately 150 °F (66 °C) and the liquid is then pumped back into the absorber to continue the process of absorbing more H_{2}S and removing it from the gas stream. The hydrocarbon solution has a low corrosion rate.

== Patent information for CrystaSulf ==
6,416,729 B1; Process for removing hydrogen sulfide from gas streams which include or are supplemented with sulfur dioxide, by scrubbing with a nonaqueous sorbent; 9-Jul-2002; David W. DeBerry, Dennis A. Dalrymple

6,818,194; Process for removing hydrogen sulfide from gas streams which include or are supplemented with sulfur dioxide, by scrubbing with a nonaqueous sorbent; 16-Nov-2004; David W. DeBerry, Dennis A. Dalrymple, Kevin S. Fisher

5,733,516; Process for removal OF hydrogen sulfide from a gas stream; 31-Mar-1998; David W. DeBerry

5,738,834; System for removal of hydrogen sulfide from a gas stream; 14-Apr-1998; David W. DeBerry

== See also ==
- Acid gas
- Amine treating
- Claus process
- Crystatech
- Hydrogenation
- Sour gas
