= ProMax =

ProMax is a chemical process simulator for process troubleshooting and design, developed and sold by Bryan Research and Engineering, Inc. Initially released in late 2005, ProMax is a continuance of two previous process simulators, PROSIM and TSWEET. ProMax is considered the industry standard for designing amine gas treating and glycol dehydration units.

== Program History ==
In 1974 Bryan Research and Engineering (BR&E) began developing simulation software for sulfur recovery units with a command-line interface. In 1976 this program was released under the name SULFUR. Amine sweetening, for which BR&E is most well known, was added in 1978 and the simulation package was renamed TSWEET. A second product, DEHY, was released in 1980 for modeling glycol dehydration units. Natural gas processing was added to the DEHY program in 1983 and the package was renamed PROSIM. In 1988 BR&E introduced a graphical user interface to both programs, a novelty for chemical process simulators at the time.

TSWEET and PROSIM were both MS-DOS based programs and were both incorporated into ProMax. ProMax is a late generation Windows application which uses Microsoft Visio as the graphical user interface. Other capabilities were included in ProMax besides those already available in TSWEET and PROSIM enabling it to model almost any process in the oil and gas industry.

== Company history ==
Bryan Research & Engineering, Inc. (BR&E) is a privately owned provider of software and engineering solutions to the oil, gas, refining and chemical industries. Since the company’s inception in 1974, BR&E has combined research and development in process simulation to provide clients with simulation tools.
