= N-Methyl-2-pyrrolidone =

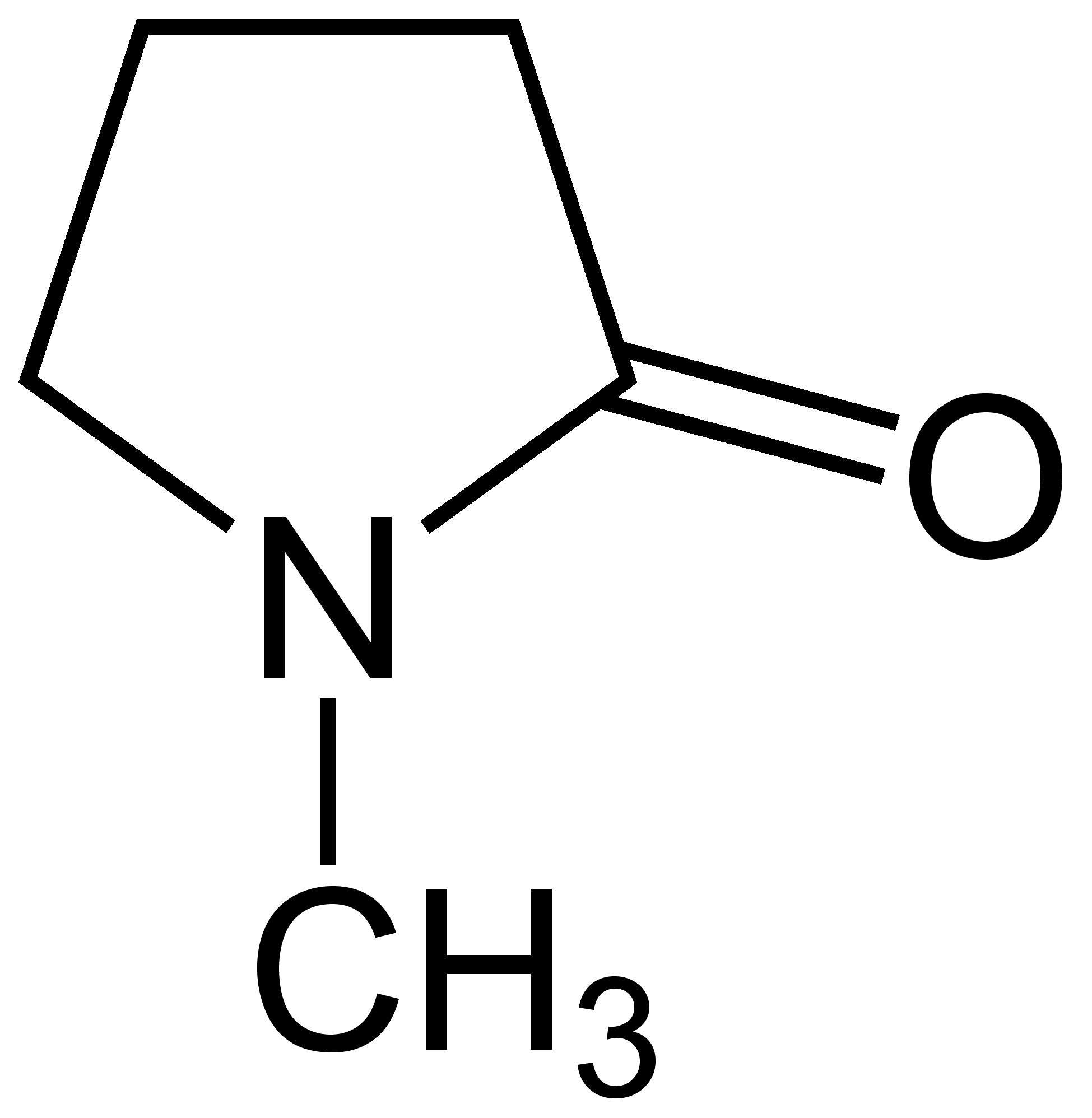

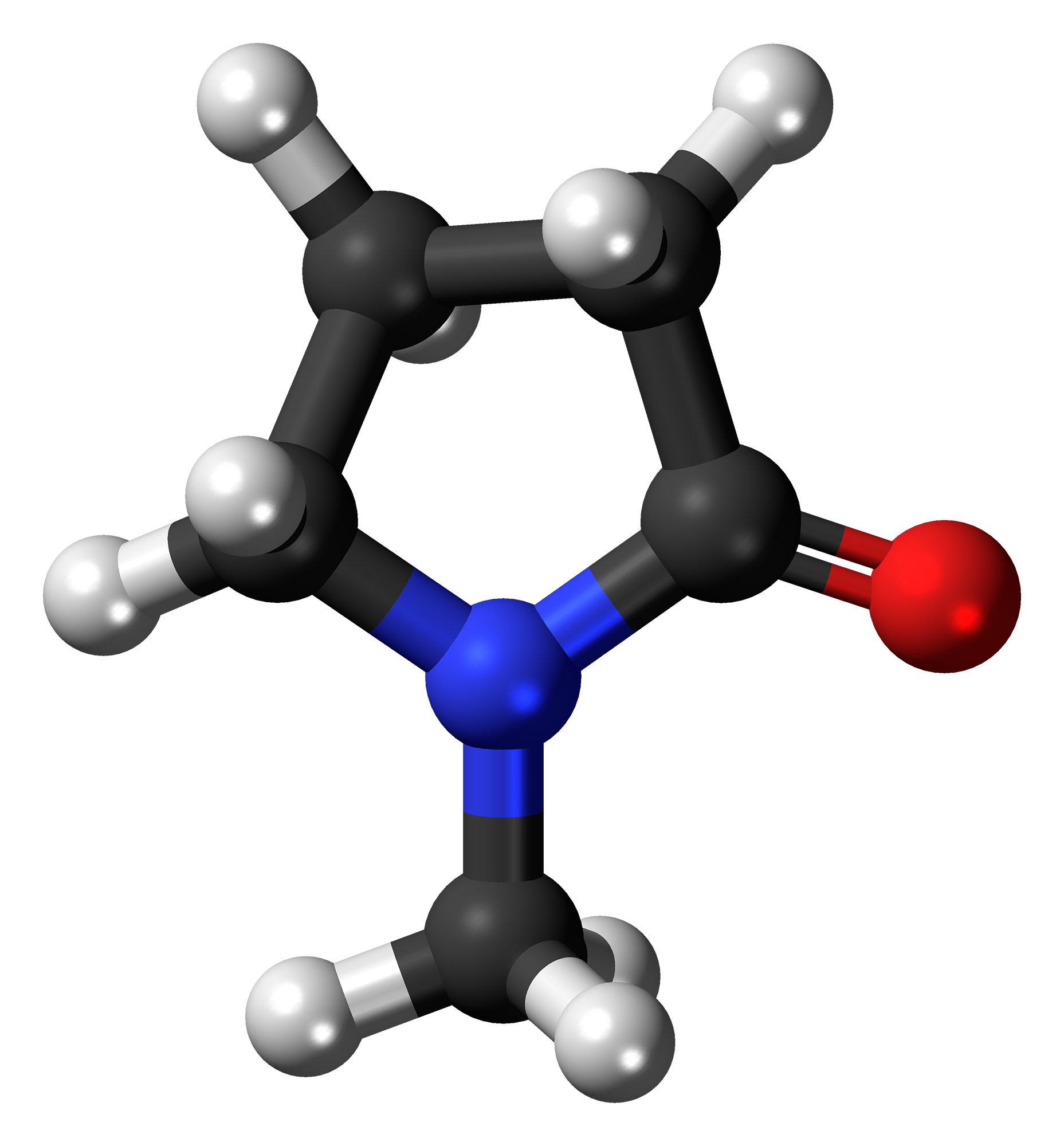

Names
- Preferred IUPAC name 1-Methylpyrrolidin-2-one
- Other names 1-Methyl-2-pyrrolidone; N-Methylpyrrolidone; N-Methylpyrrolidinone; Pharmasolve

Identifiers
CAS Number	872-50-4
3D model (JSmol)	Interactive image
ChEBI	CHEBI:7307
ChEMBL	ChEMBL12543
ChemSpider	12814
ECHA InfoCard	100.011.662
KEGG	C11118
PubChem CID	13387
UNII	JR9CE63FPM
CompTox Dashboard (EPA)	DTXSID6020856
- InChI: InChI=1S/C5H9NO/c1-6-4-2-3-5(6)7/h2-4H2,1H3 Key: SECXISVLQFMRJM-UHFFFAOYSA-N; InChI=1/C5H9NO/c1-6-4-2-3-5(6)7/h2-4H2,1H3 Key: SECXISVLQFMRJM-UHFFFAOYAL
- SMILES: CN1CCCC1=O

Properties
Chemical formula	C_{5}H_{9}NO
Molar mass	99.133 g·mol^{−1}
Density	1.028 g/cm^{3}
Melting point	−24 °C (−11 °F; 249 K)
Boiling point	202 to 204 °C (396 to 399 °F; 475 to 477 K)
Solubility in water	Miscible
Solubility in Ethanol, acetone, diethylether, ethyl acetate, chloroform, benzene	Soluble
log P	−0.40

Hazards
NFPA 704 (fire diamond)	2 2 1
Flash point	91 °C (196 °F; 364 K)
Autoignition temperature	245 °C (473 °F; 518 K)
- Except where otherwise noted, data are given for materials in their standard state (at 25 °C [77 °F], 100 kPa). verify (what is ?) Infobox references

N-Methyl-2-pyrrolidone (NMP) is an organic compound consisting of a 5-membered lactam. It is a colorless liquid, although impure samples can appear yellow. It is miscible with water and with most common organic solvents. It also belongs to the class of dipolar aprotic solvents such as dimethylformamide and dimethyl sulfoxide. It is used in the petrochemical, polymer and battery industries as a solvent, exploiting its nonvolatility and ability to dissolve diverse materials (including polyvinylidene difluoride, PVDF). It has a strong dipole moment and hydrogen bonding due to its cis-amide conformation.

== Preparation ==
NMP is produced industrially by a typical ester-to-amide conversion, by treating gamma-butyrolactone with methylamine. Alternative routes include the partial hydrogenation of N-methylsuccinimide and the reaction of acrylonitrile with methylamine followed by hydrolysis. About 200,000 to 250,000 tons are produced annually.

== Reactions ==
NMP reacts with phosphorus pentasulfide to give its analogous thioamide.

With sodium hydroxide NMP undergoes reversible ring opening, yielding sodium N-methyl-4-aminobutyrate.

== Applications ==
NMP is used to recover certain hydrocarbons generated in the processing of petrochemicals, such as the recovery of 1,3-butadiene and acetylene. Its good solvency properties have also led to NMP's use to dissolve a wide range of polymers. Specifically, it is used as a solvent for surface treatment of textiles, resins, and metal coated plastics or as a paint stripper. NMP is also used as a solvent in the production of polyphenylene sulfide.

NMP is used in the production of aramid fibers Twaron and Kevlar. In the pharmaceutical industry, N-methyl-2-pyrrolidone is used in the formulation for drugs by both oral and transdermal delivery routes. It is also used heavily in lithium ion battery fabrication, as a solvent for electrode preparation, because NMP has a unique ability to dissolve polyvinylidene fluoride binder.

=== Purisol process ===
In the Purisol process, developed by Lurgi AG in the 1960s, a cold (ca. −15 °C) aqueous solution of NMP is used to remove hydrogen sulfide from sour gas and from hydrodesulfurization facilities. It offers some advantages over the Selexol process in that it is more selective for hydrogen sulfide. Furthermore, it promotes the hydrolysis of some carbonyl sulfide, a common component of sour gas:

COS + H_{2}O → CO_{2} + H_{2}S

This hydrolysis step further enriches the hydrogen sulfide content of the off-gas when the NMP is stripped. The sulfur-rich gas is well suited for a Claus unit, which affords solid elemental sulfur.

== Safety ==
N-Methyl-2-pyrrolidone (NMP) is classified as a reproductive toxicant (H360D: May damage the unborn child) and can cause skin and eye irritation and respiratory irritation (H315, H319, H335). Studies show NMP exposure can increase the risk of developmental toxicity, including miscarriage and fetal death. Good ventilation and PPE are recommended for safe handling.

== See also ==
- 2-Pyrrolidone
- 1,3-Dimethyl-2-imidazolidinone (DMI)
