= Shell–Paques process =

The Shell–Paques process, also known by the trade name of Thiopaq O&G, is a gas desulfurization technology for the removal of hydrogen sulfide from natural-, refinery-, synthesis- and biogas. The process was initially named after the Shell Oil and Paques purification companies. After accession of a dedicated joint venture by the founders, Paqell B.V., the trade name for applications in the Oil & Gas industry was changed to "THIOPAQ O&G". It is based on the biocatalytical conversion of sulfide into elemental sulfur. It operates at near-ambient conditions of temperature, about 30-40 °C, and pressure which results in inherent safety. It is an alternative to, for example, the Claus process.

== Process chemistry ==
Each reaction can be applied individually or sequentially as dictated by the characteristics of the stream to be treated. The process consist of three main sections: An absorber (gas washing section), a bioreactor (sulfide oxidation and regeneration of washing liquid) and Sulfur handling section as shown in the figure below:

The washing step uses a dilute alkaline solution to remove hydrogen sulfide (H_{2}S) from the sour gas according to:

H_{2}S + NaOH → NaHS + H_{2}O

The loaded washing liquid is transported to a bioreactor where a biocatalyst oxidises the aqueous NaHS to elemental sulfur with about 95% selectivity according to:

NaHS + ½ O_{2} → S + NaOH

Combined reaction equation:

H_{2}S + ½ O_{2} → S + H_{2}O

The regenerated washing liquid is sent back to the washing column.

The controlled partial oxidation of sulfide to elemental sulfur (2) is catalyzed by naturally occurring microorganisms of the genus Halothiobacillus in the bioreactor. These natural, living microorganisms present in the bioreactor catalyse the sulfur conversions and are, by their nature, resilient and adaptive.

In many situations the process can be used for sulfur removal and recovery. When sulfur recovery is desired, the elemental sulfur produced in the aerobic bioreactor will be separated from the aqueous effluent in a separator inside of the reactor. The excess sulfur will be removed as aqueous slurry or cake of up to 65% dry solids content. There are several options for handling this slurry and to convert it into products for sulfuric acid generation, fertiliser or fungicide.

The system is flexible and has several processing options that have ready application in the petroleum refinery or petrochemical complex for managing a variety of sulfur-containing streams including sulfidic caustic, LPG, hydrotreater offgas and fuel gas.

== See also ==
- Flue-gas desulfurization
