= Sulfur production in the United States =

Sulfur production in the United States was 8.20 million metric tons of sulfur content in 2024, most of it recovered as a byproduct, from oil refineries, natural gas processing plants, and metal smelters. The United States was second in the world in sulfur production in 2024, well behind China at 19 million metric tons. The sulfur recovered was marketed in the forms of native (elemental) sulfur, and sulfuric acid. Sulfur prices & production have been variable, a result of volatility in the demand for sulfur.

Byproduct sulfur from oil refineries, gas processing plants, and metal smelters is a "nondiscretionary byproduct," meaning that the sulfur recovery is mandated by environmental regulations put in place to prevent air pollution. Because the sulfur must be removed as a cost of producing the primary product, the sulfur byproduct will be sold, even at a price lower than the cost of recovery. This has enabled byproduct sulfur to drive other forms of sulfur production, notably Frasch sulfur, out of the market in the United States.

== Markets ==
The largest market in the US is in the manufacture of fertilizers, which makes up about two-thirds of consumption.

== History ==
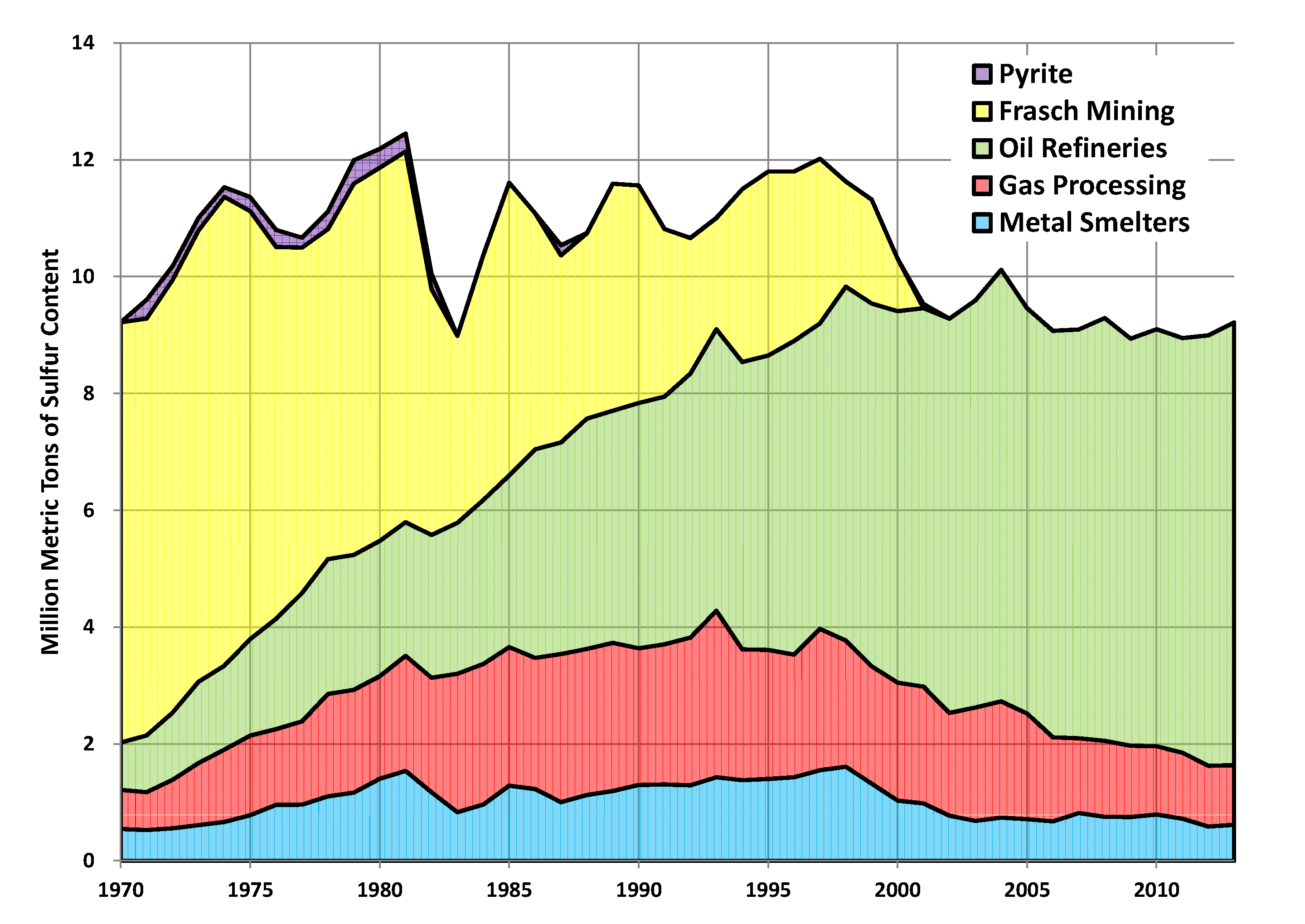
U.S sulfur production by source, 1970-2013 (United States Geological Survey data)

=== Pyrite ===
Pyrite, which is made up of iron sulfide, made up more than 10 percent of the sulfur production in the 1920s, but declined slowly, until the last pyrite mining in the US stopped in 2001.

=== Frasch sulfur mining ===
The Frasch process was first used in 1894 in Louisiana, and in the early 1900s came into wide use in mining native sulfur deposits, especially deposits in the caprock of salt domes along the Gulf Coast of the United States. Frasch mining dominated sulfur mining in the U.S. for most of the 20th century, for many years providing more than 80 percent of the sulfur production. The last U.S. Frasch mine shut down in 2000, although the process is still used in other countries.

=== Recovery from smelters ===
In many ores of copper, zinc, lead, and molybdenum, the metals are in the form of sulfide minerals. These include the principal ore minerals of copper (chalcocite, chalcopyrite), zinc (sphalerite), lead (galena), and molybdenum (molybdenite). In addition, pyrite (an iron sulfide) is often present. Most sulfur is driven out of the solid phase in the roasting process. The sulfur is recovered in the form of sulfuric acid.

Sulfur recovery from smelters rose from 544,000 metric tons in 1970 to 1,403,000 tons in 1980, due to tightened air emissions standards. Sulfur recovery peaked in 1988 at 1,610,000 tons, then declined to 730,000 tons in 2014, coinciding with a decline in the U.S. metal smelting industry.

=== Recovery from petroleum refineries ===
Some oil, called sour oil, is naturally high in sulfur. The sulfur is largely incorporated into the organic molecules in the petroleum. Some sulfur has always been recovered from sour oil, but a series of tightened federal standards for air pollution led to restrictions on sulfur content in petroleum fuels, which resulted in a great increase in recovered sulfur, starting in the 1970s.

=== Recovery from natural gas processing ===
Like sour oil, there is some natural gas naturally high in sulfur, called sour gas (natural gas with little or no sulfur is called sweet gas). The sulfur is present in the form of hydrogen sulfide, a toxic gas that must be removed for safety reasons. Most natural gas has less than 1 percent hydrogen sulfide, but deposits have been discovered with more than 80 percent hydrogen sulfide. Sour gas is most often associated with carbonate rocks, and especially with anhydrite. Hydrogen sulfide is also corrosive, so that gas high in hydrogen sulfide requires special corrosion-resistant production equipment, as well as extra safety precautions. The requirement that gas processors remove the sulfur causes sour gas to receive a lower producer price than sweet gas.

== International trade ==
The U.S. imports about 11 percent of the sulfur it uses. Principal sources of sulfur imported into the U.S. are Canada and Mexico.
