= Liquid carryover =

Unintended transport of liquids in gas pipelines

Liquid carryover refers to the unintended transport of liquids such as water, hydrocarbon condensates, compressor oil or glycol in a natural gas, hydrogen, carbon dioxide or other industrial gas pipeline or process. Ideally, only gas enters gas processing.

Understanding pipeline composition at critical points is crucial to ensure optimal efficiency and safety.

Natural gas processing aims to deliver gas suitable for transmission systems without causing operational issues in downstream pipelines, compressors, or equipment. Ideally, all dry industrial gases remain "dry" during processing. However, due to fluid dynamics complexities, gas and liquid phases may not fully separate, leading to wet gas or two-phase flows. These can occur as mist flow (tiny liquid droplets) or stratified flow (a liquid stream along the pipe wall). These conditions can significantly impact gas processing facilities' operational safety, efficiency, and lifespan.

== Challenges and risks ==
Liquid carryover is a major concern, responsible for roughly 60% of plant failures in natural gas processing. Effective phase separation at the beginning of the processing train prevents hydrocarbons and other liquids from entering the gas treatment plant. Improper separation allows liquid carryover to contaminate the desulfurization stage, triggering foaming and fouling, leading to unplanned shutdowns and reduced gas flow.

As the gas progresses through desulfurization and dehumidification, it comes into contact with significant processing liquids. Amine-based liquids used in desulfurization to remove hydrogen sulfide (H_{2}S) and carbon dioxide (CO_{2}) can carry over if not properly separated, contaminating the dehumidification stage. Dehumidification utilizes a liquid desiccant, such as monoethylene glycol (MEG) or triethylene glycol (TEG), to reduce gas moisture content and meet sales gas specifications. Carryover of glycol into this process can cause issues by blocking heat exchangers or disrupting temperature control. Notably, while glycol is a common component found during pipeline pigging analysis, there's currently no method to directly determine glycol carryover besides process cameras.

The primary method for extracting natural gas liquids (NGLs) involves reducing gas temperature below its hydrocarbon dew point, separating the liquids. However, achieving temperature reduction through Joule-Thompson pressure reduction creates ideal conditions for sub-micron mist flow formation. This type of wet gas flow is particularly challenging to filter and requires specialized filtration systems. As the gas warms up, the liquids vaporize, saturating the vapor phase with respect to hydrocarbons. This can lead to liquid dropout as mist or stratified flows due to pressure and temperature drops during gas transmission.

Over time, solid and liquid accumulation at low points in the transmission system can lead to corrosion, potentially causing ruptures and failures at compressor stations.

== Traditional monitoring techniques ==
Standards from the American Petroleum Institute (API) 14.1 and the International Organization for Standardization (ISO) EN10715 provide guidance for gas sampling for either laboratory or online analyzers of gas streams. They also offer guidelines for managing high-pressure gases to prevent liquid dropout in the sample system during pressure reduction from line pressure to atmospheric pressure. These standards aim to ensure a representative gas sample reaches the analyzer and prevent liquids from damaging it. However, wet gas or two-phase flows fall outside the scope of these standards, meaning gas analyzers can have significant errors and often miss liquid carryover events.

== Impact on operations ==
Liquid carryover's operational inefficiencies have both immediate and long-term consequences. Foaming, requiring reduced gas flow and de-foaming chemicals, can occur. As a precaution, gas processing facilities may intentionally limit operational capacities, sacrificing optimal gas throughput. For gas processors, errors in hydrocarbon dew point and BTU determination can lead to lost revenue, pigging costs, and rectification or rebuild costs.

== Transmission system ==
The presence of wet gas and liquid hold-up in pipelines significantly increases the risks of pipeline ruptures and shortens the lifespan of pipeline assets. To mitigate these risks, operators must increase the frequency of pipeline pigging.

== Power stations ==
As the gas reaches the power station, the likelihood of contamination rises due to various factors. These include:

- Fouling: Build-up of unwanted materials within the pipeline.
- Natural gas liquids (NGLs) carryover: NGLs are heavier hydrocarbons that can condense and enter the gas stream under certain conditions.
- Lubrication grease: Grease used during valve operations can inadvertently enter the gas stream.
- Compressor oil leaks: Leaking compressor oil can contaminate the gas.
- Iron sulfides: These compounds can form on the pipe wall and become entrained in the gas flow.

Even though some power stations preheat the fuel gas, contamination with compressor oil or glycol (if not properly vaporized) can cause several maintenance issues. These include:

- Blockage and wear of fuel nozzles, leading to uneven combustion.
- Hot spots on turbine blades, potentially forcing the power station offline.

== Liquefied natural gas (LNG) plants ==
Liquid carryover in incoming natural gas feed lines can also disrupt operations at LNG plants. Molecular sieves, used to dry the gas to extremely low moisture levels, become contaminated and lose efficiency when exposed to liquid hydrocarbons. In some cases, heavy hydrocarbons, believed to be compressor oil, have reached the LNG plant's "cold box," causing pressure differentials and shortening the operational period of the LNG train.

== Calorific value and flow measurements ==
During periods of mixed-phase flow (containing both gas and liquid), removing liquids from the gas sample being analyzed can lead to significant errors in determining the calorific value (BTU) of the gas. This makes it difficult to obtain an accurate picture of the overall fluid stream.

Gas analyzers can only report on the portion of the fluid they are presented with. This means that measurements made at custody transfer points, where gas ownership changes hands, are unreliable when two-phase flow is present. Process camera systems offer the highest level of sensitivity to both mist flow and stratified flow, providing operators with greater certainty about gas quality and improving the accuracy of BTU or Wobbe Index measurements.

When liquid carryover is not specifically monitored, operators remain unaware of both continuous and occasional liquid events that significantly affect BTU calculations. This leads to inaccurate gas quality measurements.

Process camera systems have observed that when liquid events occur as stratified flow, debris from the pipe wall (such as iron sulfide and scale) can accumulate on the bottom of the pipe. The high-velocity gas stream above the liquid layer removes lighter liquids, leaving behind a sludge that eventually dries into a stationary material. This material can reduce the pipe diameter.

If this scenario occurs at a custody transfer point, flow computers might use an incorrect pipe diameter in their calculations. Even with a properly calibrated flow meter, small amounts of debris (2-3mm) can cause a significant offset (0.2%) in the measurement. To ensure accurate fiscal measurements, these potential errors must be continuously monitored and factored into the uncertainty budget for all flow meters.

The Sarbanes-Oxley Act mandates that flow uncertainty budgets for fiscal flow measurements account for potential errors. Unexpected liquids in dry gas systems can substantially increase the uncertainty budget associated with both flow and BTU measurements.
