= Rectisol =

Rectisol is the trade name for an acid gas removal process that uses methanol as a solvent to separate acid gases such as hydrogen sulfide and carbon dioxide from valuable feed gas streams. By doing so, the feed gas is made more suitable for combustion and/or further processing. Rectisol is used most often to treat synthesis gas (primarily hydrogen and carbon monoxide) produced by gasification of coal or heavy hydrocarbons, as the methanol solvent is well able to remove trace contaminants such as ammonia, mercury, and hydrogen cyanide usually found in these gases. As an acid gas and large component of valuable feed gas streams, CO_{2} is separated during the methanol solvent regeneration.

== Process description ==
In the Rectisol process (licensed by both Linde AG and Air Liquide), cold methanol at approximately –40 °F (–40 °C) dissolves (absorbs) the acid gases from the feed gas at relatively high pressure, usually 400 to 1000 psia (2.76 to 6.89 MPa). The rich solvent containing the acid gases is then let down in pressure to release and recover the acid gases. The Rectisol process can operate selectively to recover hydrogen sulfide and carbon dioxide as separate streams, so that the hydrogen sulfide can be sent to either a Claus unit for conversion to elemental sulfur or a WSA Process unit to recover sulfuric acid, while at the same time the carbon dioxide can be sequestered (CCS) or used for enhanced oil recovery.

Rectisol, like Selexol and Purisol, is a physical solvent, unlike amine based acid gas removal solvents that rely on a chemical reaction with the acid gases. Methanol as a solvent is inexpensive compared to the proprietary Selexol and Purisol solvents. The Rectisol process requires more electrical energy for refrigeration to maintain the low temperatures required but it also requires less steam energy for regeneration. Although capital costs for methanol solvent (Rectisol) units are higher than proprietary solvent units, methanol as a cold, physical solvent can remove greater percentages of acid gas components providing a higher purity cleaned gas.

The Rectisol process is very flexible and can be configured to address the separation of synthesis gas into various components, depending on the final products that are desired from the gas. It is very suitable to complex schemes where a combination of products are needed, for example hydrogen, carbon monoxide, ammonia and methanol synthesis gases and fuel gas side streams.

== See also ==
- Hydrodesulfurization
- Selexol
- Amine treating
- Sour gas
