= Selexol =

Solvent for Acid Gas Removal

Selexol is the trade name for an acid gas removal solvent that can separate acid gases such as hydrogen sulfide and carbon dioxide from feed gas streams such as synthesis gas produced by gasification of coal, coke, or heavy hydrocarbon oils. By doing so, the feed gas is made more suitable (less sour) for combustion and/or further processing. It is made up of dimethyl ethers of polyethylene glycol.

== Process description ==
In the Selexol process (now licensed by UOP LLC), the Selexol solvent dissolves (absorbs) the acid gases from the feed gas at relatively high pressure, usually 300 to 2000 psia (2.07 to 13.8 MPa). The rich solvent containing the acid gases is then let down in pressure and/or steam stripped to release and recover the acid gases. The Selexol process can operate selectively to recover hydrogen sulfide and carbon dioxide as separate streams, so that the hydrogen sulfide can be sent to either a Claus unit for conversion to elemental sulfur or to a wet sulfuric acid process unit for conversion to sulfuric acid while, at the same time, the carbon dioxide can be sequestered or used for enhanced oil recovery. The Selexol process is similar to the Rectisol process, which uses refrigerated methanol as the solvent. The Selexol solvent is a mixture of the dimethyl ethers of polyethylene glycol.

Selexol is a physical solvent, unlike amine based acid gas removal solvents that rely on a chemical reaction with the acid gases. Since no chemical reactions are involved, Selexol usually requires less energy than the amine based processes. However, at feed gas pressures below about 300 psia (2.07 MPa), the Selexol solvent capacity (in amount of acid gas absorbed per volume of solvent) is reduced and the amine based processes will usually be superior.

== See also ==
- Hydrodesulfurization
- Rectisol
- Amine treating
