= Promax =

Promax may refer to:

- ProMax, a chemical process simulator
- Promax Awards, in advertising
- Promax rotation, a method used in factor analysis
- Pro Max, a series of large form factor iPhone devices introduced in 2019
