= Glycol dehydration =

Dessicant system for natural gas

Glycol dehydration is a liquid desiccant system for the removal of water from natural gas and natural gas liquids (NGL). It is the most common and economical means of water removal from these streams. Glycols typically seen in industry include triethylene glycol (TEG), diethylene glycol (DEG), ethylene glycol (MEG), and tetraethylene glycol (TREG). TEG is the most commonly used glycol in industry.

== Purpose ==
The purpose of a glycol dehydration unit is to remove water from natural gas and natural gas liquids. When produced from a reservoir, natural gas usually contains a large amount of water and is typically completely saturated or at the water dew point. This water can cause several problems for downstream processes and equipment. At low temperatures the water can either freeze in piping or, as is more commonly the case, form hydrates with CO_{2} and hydrocarbons (mainly methane hydrates). Depending on composition, these hydrates can form at relatively high temperatures plugging equipment and piping. Glycol dehydration units depress the hydrate formation point of the gas through water removal.

Without dehydration, a free water phase (liquid water) could also drop out of the natural gas as it is either cooled or the pressure is lowered through equipment and piping. This free water phase will often contain some portions of acid gas (such as H_{2}S and CO_{2}) and can cause corrosion.

For the above two reasons the Gas Processors Association sets out a pipeline quality specification for gas that the water content should not exceed 7 pounds per million standard cubic feet. Glycol dehydration units must typically meet this specification at a minimum, although further removal may be required if additional hydrate formation temperature depression is required, such as upstream of a cryogenic process or gas plant.

== Process description ==
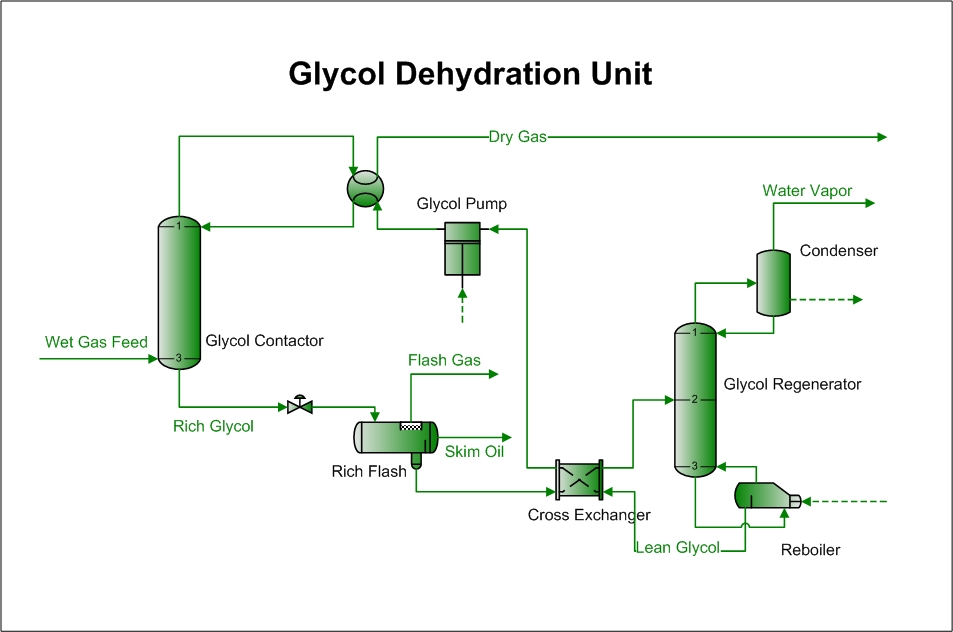
An example process flow diagram for this system

Lean, water-free glycol (purity >99%) is fed to the top of an absorber (also known as a "glycol contactor") where it is contacted with the wet natural gas stream. The glycol removes water from the natural gas by physical absorption and is carried out the bottom of the column. Upon exiting the absorber the glycol stream is often referred to as "rich glycol". The dry natural gas leaves the top of the absorption column and is fed either to a pipeline system or to a gas plant. Glycol absorbers can be either tray columns or packed columns. Modern glycol contactors may also incorporate advanced internal components including inlet vane diffusers, chimney trays, liquid distributors, structured packing, mesh pads and demisting cyclones to improve gas distribution, enhance mass-transfer efficiency, reduce glycol carryover, and minimise vessel height and weight requirements. In offshore and floating production applications, integrated inlet and outlet scrubber sections with high-efficiency separation internals may be incorporated within the absorber vessel to reduce footprint and improve operational performance. Advanced column internals such as Shell Turbo Technologies (STT) may further reduce absorber diameter, height, weight, and overall footprint by increasing gas-liquid contacting efficiency and hydraulic capacity, making them particularly attractive for offshore and floating production facilities where space and weight constraints are critical.

After leaving the absorber, the rich glycol is fed to a flash vessel where hydrocarbon vapors are removed and any liquid hydrocarbons are skimmed from the glycol. This step is necessary as the absorber is typically operated at high pressure and the pressure must be reduced before the regeneration step. Due to the composition of the rich glycol, a vapor phase having a high hydrocarbon content will form when the pressure is lowered.

After leaving the flash vessel, the rich glycol is heated in a cross-exchanger and fed to the stripper (also known as a regenerator). The glycol stripper consists of a column, an overhead condenser, and a reboiler. The glycol is thermally regenerated to remove excess water and regain the high glycol purity. The rich Glycols are used in heat transfers and cooling. It provides better heat transfer parameters. With water they can provide a variety of heat transfer characteristics, it also prevents the water from freezing at low temperatures within the piping system. furthermore looking at other general uses, glycol is a chemical commonly used in many commercial and industrial applications including antifreeze and coolant. Ethylene glycol helps keep your car's engine from freezing in the winter and acts as a coolant to reduce overheating in the summer

The hot, lean glycol is cooled by cross-exchange with rich glycol entering the stripper. It is then fed to a lean pump where its pressure is elevated to that of the glycol absorber. The lean solvent is cooled again with a trim cooler before being fed back into the absorber. This trim cooler can either be a cross-exchanger with the dry gas leaving the absorber or an air-cooled exchanger.

== Enhanced Stripping Methods ==
Most glycol units are fairly uniform except for the regeneration step. Several methods are used to enhance the stripping of the glycol to higher purities (higher purities are required for dryer gas out of the absorber). Since the reboiler temperature is limited to 400F or less to prevent thermal degradation of the glycol, almost all of the enhanced systems center on lowering the partial pressure of water in the system to increase stripping.

Common enhanced methods include the use of stripping gas, the use of a vacuum system (lowering the entire stripper pressure), the DRIZO process, which is similar to the use of stripping gas but uses a recoverable hydrocarbon solvent, and the Coldfinger process where the vapors in the reboiler are partially condensed and drawn out separately from the bulk liquid.
