= GDiesel =

GDiesel is a 100% drop-in alternative Diesel fuel that is manufactured by the Reno, Nevada-based Advanced Refining Concepts (ARC). This new type of Diesel results from an innovative way of combining conventional ultra-low-sulfur Diesel and natural gas— hence the "G" in the name. It burns far cleaner and significantly improves performance, delivering 10 percent or better improvement in fuel economy, depending on the application.

The inventor of GDiesel is Dr. Rudolf W. Gunnerman, who has a 40-year background in the development and marketing of energy- and fuel-related technologies. His last venture, Sulfco, which provided an ultrasound and hydrogen peroxide for efficient desulfurization, and also promised cheaper fuel, wound up bankrupt after many years of positive press releases that success was just around the corner. His son Peter is the partner and director of Advanced Refining Concepts. The firm's ClearRefining process is relatively simple, beginning with the standard ultra-low sulfur Diesel fuel that one would buy at any filling station. This feedstock is first pressurized in a steel tank to less than 10 pounds per square inch (69 kPa), and heated to about 250 °F (121 °C), much lower levels than those required during typical refinery processes. Natural gas, the same material used for cooking and heating, is piped into the tank of Diesel fuel, and the resulting mixture then swirls up and through a wheel-shaped filter wrapped with four different metal catalysts — cobalt, among others.

In August 2010, GDiesel received formal certification as an "alternative fuel" from the Nevada Division of Environmental Protection.

The fuel is produced at the company's McCarran, Nevada facility, in which natural gas is combined with standard Diesel fuel, and is then circulated through four different metal catalysts.

Previously, the fuel was featured in publications such as Diesel World and Motor Trend.
