= C5H7NO2 =

The molecular formula C_{5}H_{7}NO_{2} may refer to:

- Ethyl cyanoacetate
- N-Methylsuccinimide
- Piperidinediones
  - 2,3-Piperidinedione
  - 2,4-Piperidinedione
  - 2,5-Piperidinedione
  - 2,6-Piperidinedione (glutarimide)
  - 3,4-Piperidinedione
  - 3,5-Piperidinedione
- Propargylglycine
- 1-Pyrroline-5-carboxylic acid
