= Wet process =

In process engineering Wet process may refer to:

- Wet sulfuric acid process for the manufacture of Sulphuric acid
- Any wet process in textile engineering, see Wet processing engineering
- The wet process in Coffee production
- The wet process in Coconut oil production
- The wet process used in cement manufacture in Cement kilns
- A wet process in the manufacture of Separators for electrochemical cells
- The wet process for the production of Phosphoric acid from sulfuric acid and tricalcium phosphate rock
- The wet process or "Mason method" for the manufacture of Hardboard
