= Shah gas field =

Gas field in Abu Dhabi Emirate, UAE

Shah
- Country: United Arab Emirates
- Region: Abu Dhabi
- Offshore/onshore: onshore
- Operator: Abu Dhabi National Oil Companyl

Field history
- Start of production: 2014

Production
- Current production of gas: 28.3×10^{6} m^{3}/d 1,000×10^{6} cu ft/d 10.3×10^{9} m^{3}/a (360×10^{9} cu ft/a)
- Estimated oil in place: 84.5 million tonnes (~ 100×10^{6} m^{3} or 600 million bbl)
- Estimated gas in place: 480×10^{9} m^{3} 17×10^{12} cu ft

The Shah gas field is a natural gas field in the United Arab Emirates that was discovered in 1967. It began production in 2014 and produces natural gas and condensates. The total proven reserves of the Shah gas field are around 17 trillion cubic feet (4.8×10^{11} m^{3}) and production is slated to be around 1 billion cubic feet/day (2.8×10^{7} m^{3}/d).

The gas deposits consist of 23% H_{2}S and 10% CO_{2}, making it one of the most sour operational gas fields in the world. Sour gas is defined as gas containing a high proportion of hydrogen sulphide. This environmental pollutant is required to be removed either as solid sulphur for commercial sale, or concentrated sulphide solutions are extracted and re-injected underground.
