= Hydrodenitrogenation =

Chemical process for removing nitrogen from petroleum

Hydrodenitrogenation (HDN) is an industrial process for the removal of nitrogen from petroleum. Organonitrogen compounds, even though they occur at low levels, are undesirable because they cause poisoning of downstream catalysts. Furthermore, upon combustion, organonitrogen compounds generate NOx, a pollutant. HDN is effected as general hydroprocessing, which traditionally focuses on hydrodesulfurization (HDS) because sulfur compounds are even more problematic. To some extent, hydrodeoxygenation (HDO) is also effected.

Typical organonitrogen compounds in petroleum include quinolines and porphyrins and their derivatives. The total nitrogen content is typically less than 1% and the targeted levels are in the ppm range. As described in organic geochemistry, organonitrogen compounds are derivatives or degradation products of the compounds in the living matter that comprised the precursor to fossil fuels. In HDN, the organonitrogen compounds are treated at high temperatures with hydrogen in the presence of a catalyst, the net transformation being:

R_{3}N + 3 H_{2} → 3 RH + NH_{3}

The catalysts generally consist of cobalt and nickel as well as molybdenum disulfide or less often tungsten disulfide supported on alumina. The precise composition of the catalyst, i.e. Co/Ni and Mo/W ratios, are tuned for particular feedstocks. A wide variety of catalyst compositions have been considered, including metal phosphides.
