= Crystatech =

CrystaTech, Inc.
- Company type: Private
- Industry: Energy
- Founded: Austin, Texas (1999)
- Headquarters: Austin, Texas
- Area served: Worldwide
- Key people: Management listing
- Revenue: not disclosed
- Number of employees: 10

CrystaTech Inc. is a supplier of process technology to the energy industry. CrystaTech commercializes the patented Crystasulf process. CrystaSulf is the first commercially available product to provide low cost hydrogen sulfide (H_{2}S) removal from gas streams.

The company was founded in 1999 and is financially backed by the Gas Technology Institute and major energy companies through sponsored clean energy technology development. The corporate office is located in Austin, Texas.

CrystaTech is a member of the Gas Processors Suppliers Association.

Regional offices are in Alberta, Canada and Houston, Texas. All early stage R&D takes place at the Gas Technology Institute in Des Plaines, Illinois. Representative customers include Total, Petrobank Energy and Resources Ltd., Queensland Energy Resources, U.S. Department of Energy, Luminant, and American Electric Power.

Key People

- David Work - Chairman
- Don Carlton - Independent Director
