= Natural-gas processing =

Industrial processes designed to purify raw natural gas

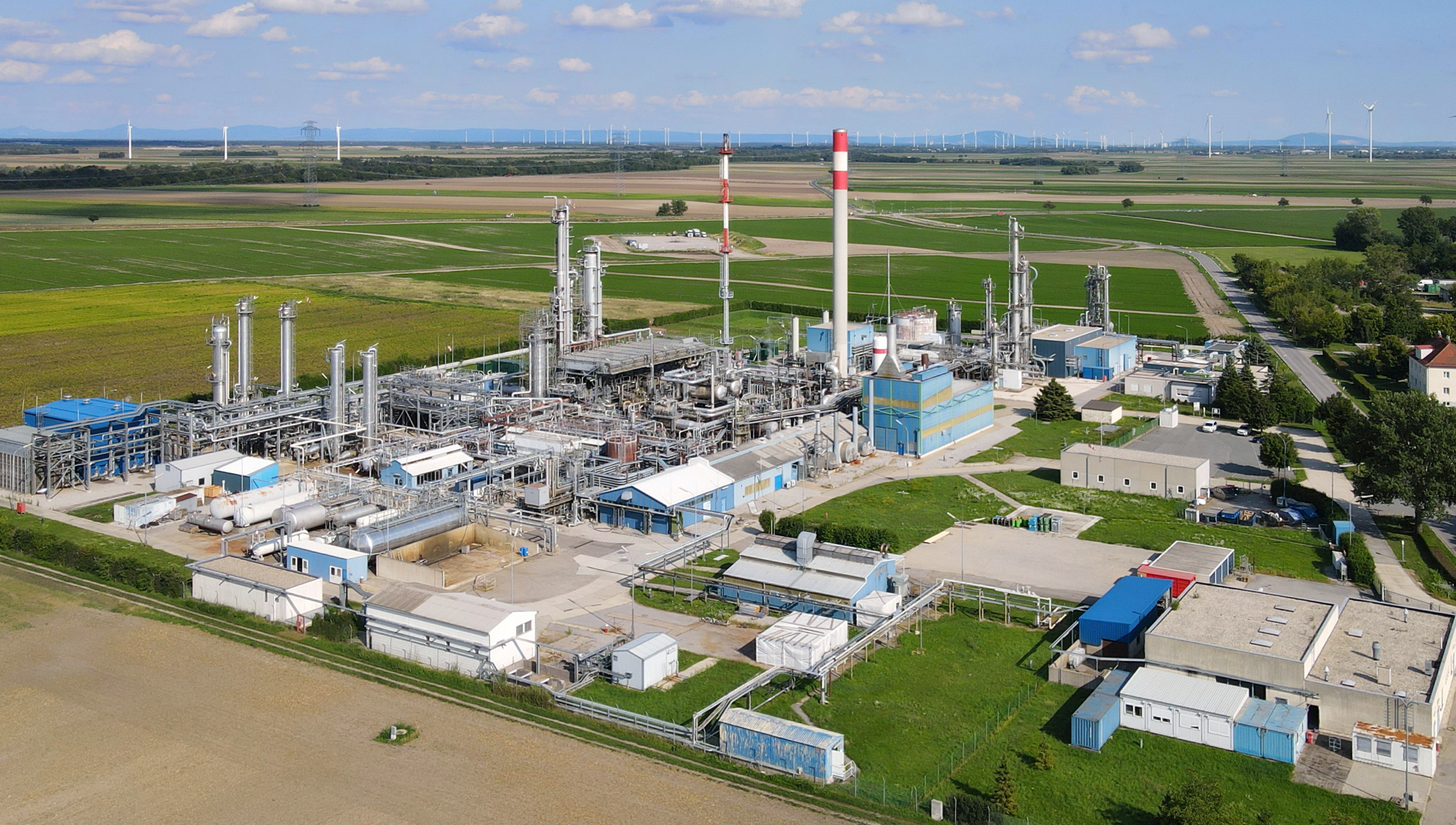
A natural-gas processing plant in Aderklaa, Austria

Natural-gas processing is a range of industrial processes designed to purify raw natural gas by removing contaminants such as solids, water, carbon dioxide (CO_{2}), hydrogen sulfide (H_{2}S), mercury and higher molecular mass hydrocarbons (condensate) to produce pipeline quality dry natural gas for pipeline distribution and final use. Some of the substances which contaminate natural gas have economic value and are further processed or sold. Hydrocarbons that are liquid at ambient conditions: temperature and pressure (i.e., pentane and heavier) are called natural-gas condensate (sometimes also called natural gasoline or simply condensate).

Raw natural gas comes primarily from three types of wells: crude oil wells, gas wells, and condensate wells. Crude oil and natural gas are often found together in the same reservoir. Natural gas produced in wells with crude oil is generally classified as associated-dissolved gas as the gas had been associated with or dissolved in crude oil. Natural gas production not associated with crude oil is classified as "non-associated". In 2009, 89 percent of U.S. wellhead production of natural gas was non-associated. Non-associated gas wells producing a dry gas in terms of condensate and water can send the dry gas directly to a pipeline or gas plant without undergoing any separation processIng allowing immediate use.

Natural-gas processing begins underground or at the well-head. In a crude oil well, natural gas processing begins as the fluid loses pressure and flows through the reservoir rocks until it reaches the well tubing. In other wells, processing begins at the wellhead which extracts the composition of natural gas according to the type, depth, and location of the underground deposit and the geology of the area.

Natural gas when relatively free of hydrogen sulfide is called sweet gas; natural gas that contains elevated hydrogen sulfide levels is called sour gas; natural gas, or any other gas mixture, containing significant quantities of hydrogen sulfide or carbon dioxide or similar acidic gases, is called acid gas.

== Types of raw-natural-gas wells ==
- Crude oil wells: Natural gas that comes from crude oil wells is typically called associated gas. This gas could exist as a separate gas cap above the crude oil in the underground reservoir or could be dissolved in the crude oil, ultimately coming out of solution as the pressure is reduced during production. Condensate produced from oil wells is often referred to as lease condensate.
- Dry gas wells: These wells typically produce only raw natural gas that contains no condensate with little to no crude oil and are called non-associated gas. Condensate from dry gas is extracted at gas processing plants and is often called plant condensate.
- Condensate wells: These wells typically produce raw natural gas along with natural gas liquid with little to no crude oil and are called non-associated gas. Such raw natural gas is often referred to as wet gas.
- Coal seam wells: These wells typically produce raw natural gas from methane deposits in the pores of coal seams, often existing underground in a more concentrated state of adsorption onto the surface of the coal itself. Such gas is referred to as coalbed gas or coalbed methane (coal seam gas in Australia). Coalbed gas has become an important source of energy in recent decades.

== Contaminants in raw natural gas ==
Raw natural gas typically consists primarily of methane (CH_{4}) and ethane (C_{2}H_{6}), the shortest and lightest hydrocarbon molecules. It often also contains varying amounts of:

- Heavier gaseous hydrocarbons: propane (C_{3}H_{8}), normal butane (n-C_{4}H_{10}), isobutane (i-C_{4}H_{10}) and pentanes. All of these are collectively referred to as Natural Gas Liquids or NGL and can be processed into finished by-products.
- Liquid hydrocarbons (also referred to as casinghead gasoline or natural gasoline) and/or crude oil.
- Acid gases: carbon dioxide (CO_{2}), hydrogen sulfide (H_{2}S) and mercaptans such as methanethiol (CH_{3}SH) and ethanethiol (C_{2}H_{5}SH).
- Hydrogen gas: Sometimes referred to as Natural hydrogen or white hydrogen
- Other gases: nitrogen (N_{2}) and helium (He).
- Water: water vapor and liquid water. Also dissolved salts and dissolved gases (acids).
- Mercury: minute amounts of mercury primarily in elemental form, but chlorides and other species are possibly present.
- Naturally occurring radioactive material (NORM): natural gas may contain radon, and the produced water may contain dissolved traces of radium, which can accumulate within piping and processing equipment; rendering piping and equipment radioactive over time.

== Natural gas quality standards ==
Raw natural gas must be purified to meet the quality standards specified by the major pipeline transmission and distribution companies. Those quality standards vary from pipeline to pipeline and are usually a function of a pipeline system's design and the markets that it serves. In general, the standards specify that the natural gas:

- Be within a specific range of heating value (caloric value). For example, in the United States, it should be about 1035 ± 5% BTU per cubic foot of gas at 1 atmosphere and 60 °F (41 MJ ± 5% per cubic metre of gas at 1 atmosphere and 15.6 °C). In the United Kingdom the gross calorific value must be in the range 37.0 – 44.5 MJ/m^{3} for entry into the National Transmission System (NTS).
- Be delivered at or above a specified hydrocarbon dew point temperature (below which some of the hydrocarbons in the gas might condense at pipeline pressure forming liquid slugs that could damage the pipeline.) Hydrocarbon dew-point adjustment reduces the concentration of heavy hydrocarbons so no condensation occurs during the ensuing transport in the pipelines. In the UK the hydrocarbon dew point is defined as <-2 °C for entry into the NTS. The hydrocarbon dewpoint changes with the prevailing ambient temperature, the seasonal variation is:

Seasonal variation of hydrocarbon dewpoint
Hydrocarbon dewpoint	30 °F (–1.1 °C)	35 °F (1.7 °C)	40 °F (4.4 °C)	45 °F (7.2 °C)	50 °F (10 °C)
Months	December January February March	April November	May October	June September	July August

The natural gas should:

- Be free of particulate solids and liquid water to prevent erosion, corrosion or other damage to the pipeline.
- Be dehydrated of water vapor sufficiently to prevent the formation of methane hydrates within the gas processing plant or subsequently within the sales gas transmission pipeline. A typical water content specification in the U.S. is that gas must contain no more than seven pounds of water per million standard cubic feet of gas. In the UK this is defined as <-10 °C @ 85barg for entry into the NTS.
- Contain no more than trace amounts of components such as hydrogen sulfide, carbon dioxide, mercaptans, and nitrogen. The most common specification for hydrogen sulfide content is 0.25 grain H_{2}S per 100 cubic feet of gas, or approximately 4 ppm. Specifications for CO_{2} typically limit the content to no more than two or three percent. In the UK hydrogen sulfide is specified ≤5 mg/m^{3} and total sulfur as ≤50 mg/m^{3}, carbon dioxide as ≤2.0% (molar), and nitrogen as ≤5.0% (molar) for entry into the NTS.
- Maintain mercury at less than detectable limits (approximately 0.001 ppb by volume) primarily to avoid damaging equipment in the gas processing plant or the pipeline transmission system from mercury amalgamation and embrittlement of aluminum and other metals.

== Description of a natural-gas processing plant ==
There are a variety of ways in which to configure the various unit processes used in the treatment of raw natural gas. The block flow diagram below is a generalized, typical configuration for the processing of raw natural gas from non-associated gas wells showing how raw natural gas is processed into sales gas piped to the end user markets. and various byproducts:

- Natural-gas condensate
- Sulfur
- Ethane
- Natural gas liquids (NGL): propane, butanes and C_{5}+ (which is the commonly used term for pentanes plus higher molecular weight hydrocarbons)

Raw natural gas is commonly collected from a group of adjacent wells and is first processed in a separator vessels at that collection point for removal of free liquid water and natural gas condensate. The condensate is usually then transported to an oil refinery and the water is treated and disposed of as wastewater.

The raw gas is then piped to a gas processing plant where the initial purification is usually the removal of acid gases (hydrogen sulfide and carbon dioxide). There are several processes available for that purpose as shown in the flow diagram, but amine treating is the process that was historically used. However, due to a range of performance and environmental constraints of the amine process, a newer technology based on the use of polymeric membranes to separate the carbon dioxide and hydrogen sulfide from the natural gas stream has gained increasing acceptance. Membranes are attractive since no reagents are consumed.

The acid gases, if present, are removed by membrane or amine treating and can then be routed into a sulfur recovery unit which converts the hydrogen sulfide in the acid gas into either elemental sulfur or sulfuric acid. Of the processes available for these conversions, the Claus process is by far the most well known for recovering elemental sulfur, whereas the conventional Contact process and the WSA (Wet sulfuric acid process) are the most used technologies for recovering sulfuric acid. Smaller quantities of acid gas may be disposed of by flaring.

The residual gas from the Claus process is commonly called tail gas and that gas is then processed in a tail gas treating unit (TGTU) to recover and recycle residual sulfur-containing compounds back into the Claus unit. Again, as shown in the flow diagram, there are a number of processes available for treating the Claus unit tail gas and for that purpose a WSA process is also very suitable since it can work autothermally on tail gases.

The next step in the gas processing plant is to remove water vapor from the gas using either the regenerable absorption in liquid triethylene glycol (TEG), commonly referred to as glycol dehydration, deliquescent chloride desiccants, and or a Pressure Swing Adsorption (PSA) unit which is regenerable adsorption using a solid adsorbent. Other newer processes like membranes may also be considered.

Mercury is then removed by using adsorption processes (as shown in the flow diagram) such as activated carbon or regenerable molecular sieves.

Although not common, nitrogen is sometimes removed and rejected using one of the three processes indicated on the flow diagram:

- Cryogenic process (Nitrogen Rejection Unit), using low temperature distillation. This process can be modified to also recover helium, if desired (see also industrial gas).
- Absorption process, using lean oil or a special solvent as the absorbent.
- Adsorption process, using activated carbon or molecular sieves as the adsorbent. This process may have limited applicability because it is said to incur the loss of butanes and heavier hydrocarbons.

=== NGL fractionation train ===
The NGL fractionation process treats offgas from the separators at an oil terminal or the overhead fraction from a crude distillation column in a refinery. Fractionation aims to produce useful products including natural gas suitable for piping to industrial and domestic consumers; liquefied petroleum gases (Propane and Butane) for sale; and gasoline feedstock for liquid fuel blending. The recovered NGL stream is processed through a fractionation train consisting of up to five distillation towers in series: a demethanizer, a deethanizer, a depropanizer, a debutanizer and a butane splitter. The fractionation train typically uses a cryogenic low temperature distillation process involving expansion of the recovered NGL through a turbo-expander followed by distillation in a demethanizing fractionating column. Some gas processing plants use lean oil absorption process rather than the cryogenic turbo-expander process.

The gaseous feed to the NGL fractionation plant is typically compressed to about 60 bar and 37 °C. The feed is cooled to -22 °C, by exchange with the demethanizer overhead product and by a refrigeration system and is split into three streams:

- Condensed liquid passes through a Joule-Thomson valve reducing the pressure to 20 bar and enters the demethanizer as the lower feed at -44.7 °C.
- Some of the vapour is routed through a turbo-expander and enters the demethanizer as the upper feed at -64 °C.
- The remaining vapor is chilled by the demethanizer overhead product and Joule-Thomson cooling (through a valve) and enters the column as reflux at -96 °C.

The overhead product is mainly methane at 20 bar and -98 °C. This is heated and compressed to yield a sales gas at 20 bar and 40 °C. The bottom product is NGL at 20 barg which is fed to the deethanizer.

The overhead product from the deethanizer is ethane and the bottoms are fed to the depropanizer. The overhead product from the depropanizer is propane and the bottoms are fed to the debutanizer. The overhead product from the debutanizer is a mixture of normal and iso-butane, and the bottoms product is a C_{5}+ gasoline mixture.

The operating conditions of the vessels in the NGL fractionation train are typically as follows.

NGL column operating conditions
	Demethanizer	Deethanizer	Depropanizer	Debutanizer	Butane Splitter
Feed pressure	60 barg	30 barg			
Feed temperature	37 °C	25 °C	37 °C	125 °C	59 °C
Column operating pressure	20 barg	26-30 barg	10-16.2 barg	3.8-17 barg	4.9-7 barg
Overhead product temperature	-98°C		50 °C	59 °C	49 °C
Bottom product temperature	12 °C	37 °C	125 °C	118 °C	67 °C
Overhead product	Methane (natural gas)	Ethane	Propane	Butane	Isobutane
Bottom product	Natural gas liquids	(Depropanizer feed)	(Debutanizer feed)	Gasoline	Normal Butane

A typical composition of the feed and product is as follows.

Stream composition, % volume
Component	Feed	NGL	Ethane	Propane	Isobutane	n-Butane	Gasoline
Methane	89.4	0.5	1.36				
Ethane	4.9	37.0	95.14	7.32			
Propane	2.2	26.0	3.5	90.18	2.0		
Isobutane	1.3	7.2		2.5	96.0	4.5	
n-Butane	2.2	14.8		2.5	2.0	95.0	3.0
Isopentane	2.2	5.0					33.13
n-Pentane	2.2	3.5				0.5	23.52
n-Hexane	2.2	4.0					26.9
n-Heptane	2.2	2.0					13.45
Total	100	100	100	100	100	100	100

=== Sweetening units ===
The recovered streams of propane, butanes and C_{5}+ may be "sweetened" in a Merox process unit to convert undesirable mercaptans into disulfides and, along with the recovered ethane, are the final NGL by-products from the gas processing plant. Currently, most cryogenic plants do not include fractionation for economic reasons, and the NGL stream is instead transported as a mixed product to standalone fractionation complexes located near refineries or chemical plants that use the components for feedstock. In case laying pipeline is not possible for geographical reason, or the distance between source and consumer exceed 3000 km, natural gas is then transported by ship as LNG (liquefied natural gas) and again converted into its gaseous state in the vicinity of the consumer.

=== Products ===
The residue gas from the NGL recovery section is the final, purified sales gas which is pipelined to the end-user markets. Rules and agreements are made between buyer and seller regarding the quality of the gas. These usually specify the maximum allowable concentration of CO_{2}, H_{2}S and H_{2}O as well as requiring the gas to be commercially free from objectionable odours and materials, and dust or other solid or liquid matter, waxes, gums and gum forming constituents, which might damage or adversely affect operation of the buyers equipment. When an upset occurs on the treatment plant buyers can usually refuse to accept the gas, lower the flow rate or re-negotiate the price.

=== Helium recovery ===
If the gas has significant helium content, the helium may be recovered by fractional distillation. Natural gas may contain as much as 7% helium, and is the commercial source of the noble gas. For instance, the Hugoton Gas Field in Kansas and Oklahoma in the United States contains concentrations of helium from 0.3% to 1.9%, which is separated out as a valuable byproduct.

== See also ==
- Liquid carryover
- Natural gas prices
- Petroleum extraction
- Oil refinery
- List of natural gas and oil production accidents in the United States
