= SNOX process =

For removing sulfur dioxide and nitrogen oxides from flue gases

The SNOX process is a process which removes sulfur dioxide, nitrogen oxides and particulates from flue gases. The sulfur is recovered as concentrated sulfuric acid and the nitrogen oxides are reduced to free nitrogen. The process is based on the well-known wet sulfuric acid process (WSA), a process for recovering sulfur from various process gases in the form of commercial quality sulfuric acid (H_{2}SO_{4}).

The SNOX process is based on catalytic reactions and does not consume water or absorbents. Neither does it produce any waste, except for the separated dust.

In addition the process can handle other sulfurous waste streams. This is highly interesting in refineries, where e.g. hydrogen sulfide (H_{2}S) gas, sour water stripper gas and Claus tail gas can be led to the SNOX plant, and thereby investment in other waste gas handling facilities can be saved.

== Process ==
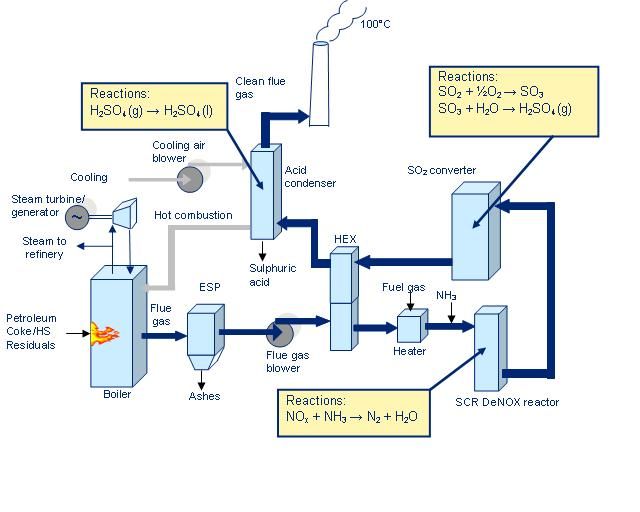

The SNOX process includes the following steps:

- Dust removal
- Catalytic reduction of NO_{x} by adding NH_{3} to the gas upstream of the SCR DeNO_{x} reactor
- Catalytic oxidation of SO_{2} to SO_{3} in the oxidation reactor
- Cooling of the gas to about 100 °C whereby the H_{2}SO_{4} condenses and can be withdrawn as concentrated sulfuric acid

== Applications ==
The SNOX process developed by Haldor Topsoe has been specifically designed for power and steam generation plants to remove sulfur and nitrogen oxides from combustion of heavy residuals, petroleum coke, sour gases, or other waste products from refineries.

Today, refineries are struggling to find ways to dispose of their increasing amount of sulfurous streams and waste products. Large amounts of high-sulfur residuals, particularly heavy oil and petroleum coke, are being produced and sold as fuel to the marine market or the cement industry. These off-take markets are, however, changing due to environmental constraints, and new markets have to be identified. One attractive option would be to use these residual fuels to produce power and steam, leaving behind the issue of emissions to be addressed. The SNOX technology is especially suitable for cleaning flue gases from combustion of high-sulfur fuels in refineries. The SNOX process is a very energy-efficient way to convert the NOx in the flue gas into nitrogen and the SOx into concentrated sulfuric acid of commercial quality without using any absorbents and without producing waste products or waste water. Along with the flue gases, other sulfurous waste streams from a refinery can be treated, such as H_{2}S gas, sour water stripping (SWS) gas, Claus tail gas and elemental sulfur, potentially turning this technology into a complete sulfur management system.

Possible configurations:

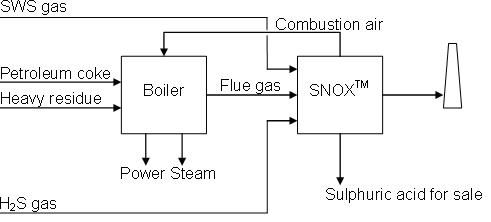

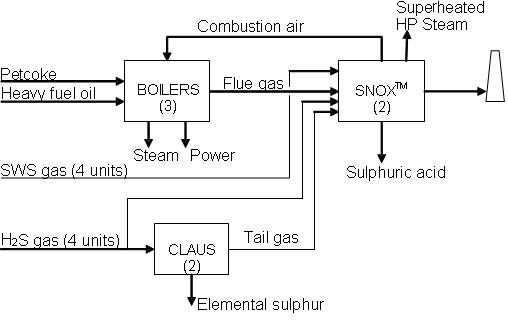

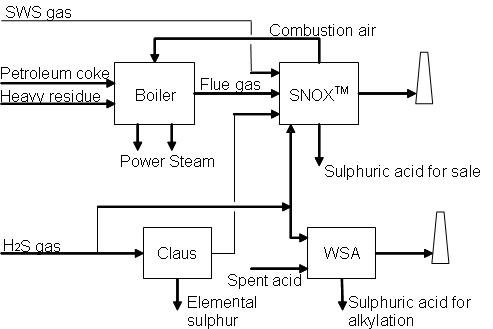

=== Flue-gas desulfurization ===
The SNOX process can be applied for treatment of flue gases from combustion of primarily high-sulfur fuels in power stations, refinery and other industrial boilers and for treatment of other waste gases containing sulfur compounds and nitrogen oxides.

The first full scale plant treating 1,000,000 Nm³/h flue gas from a 300 MW coal-fired power plant in Denmark was started up in 1991.

The largest SNOX plant in operation treats 1,200,000 Nm³/h flue gas from four petroleum coke fired boilers at a refinery in Sicily, Italy.

The process catalytically reduces both the SO_{2} and the NO_{x} in flue gases by more than 95% and with integration of the recovered heat from the WSA condenser it is reported to have lower operating costs than conventional technologies.

Recycling of hot combustion air from the SNOX plants to the boilers in combination with high pressure steam production in the SNOX plants increase the thermal efficiency and output of the boilers, resulting in a proportional reduction in CO_{2} emission.

=== Enhanced sulfuric acid production ===
In several places there is a need for both electric power and sulfuric acid. A cheap high-sulfur fuel such as petroleum coke can be used for power generation, while the flue gas is cleaned in an SNOX plant producing sulfuric acid. Elemental sulfur is fired in the SNOX plant in order to produce the desired amount of sulfuric acid.

== See also ==
- Flue-gas desulfurization
