= Desulfurization =

Removal of sulfur from a substance

Desulfurization or desulphurisation is a chemical process for the removal of sulfur from a material. The term usually refers to the removal of sulfur from a molecule or a material by hydrogenolysis:

R_{2}S + 2 H_{2} → 2RH + H_{2}S

Hydrogen is the ultimate sulfur acceptor. As applied to oil refinery streams, the conversion is known as hydrodesulfurization. These processes are of industrial and environmental importance as they provide the bulk of sulfur used in industry (Claus process and Contact process), sulfur-free compounds that could otherwise not be used in a great number of catalytic processes, and also reduce the release of harmful sulfur compounds into the environment.

A laboratory scale hydrogenolysis is the desulfurization of thioketals by Raney nickel. In such cases, the hydrogen is contained within the reagent.

Example of desulfurization of thioacetals using Raney nickel

== Desulfurization without hydrogenolysis ==
Desulfurization without hydrogenolysis is uncommon. Some trithiocarbonates can be coupled by desulfurization with phosphites or phosphines as S-atom acceptors. This approach has been described by the following equation:

2 R_{2}C=S + 2 PR'_{3} → R_{2}C=CR_{2} + 2 R'_{3}P=S

== Other ==
Other processes used for desulfurization include hydrodesulfurization, the SNOX process and the wet sulfuric acid process (WSA process).

== See also ==
- Shell–Paques process
- Flue-gas desulfurization
- Biodesulfurization
