= N-Methylsuccinimide =

Organic metabolite of NMP

Names
- IUPAC name 1-Methylpyrrolidine-2,5-dione
- Systematic IUPAC name 1-Methyl-2,5-pyrrolidinedione
- Other names: N-Methyl-2,5-pyrrolidinedione; 1-Methyl-2,5-Pyrrolidinedione; 1-Methylsuccinimide

Identifiers
CAS Number	1121-07-9
3D model (JSmol)	Interactive image
Abbreviations	MSI
Beilstein Reference	110486
ChEMBL	ChEMBL317929
ChemSpider	63882
EC Number	214-299-2
PubChem CID	70717
UNII	FT9GT286W2
CompTox Dashboard (EPA)	DTXSID40149902
- InChI: InChI=1S/C5H7NO2/c1-6-4(7)2-3-5(6)8/h2-3H2,1H3 Key: KYEACNNYFNZCST-UHFFFAOYSA-N
- SMILES: CN1C(=O)CCC1=O

Properties
Chemical formula	C_{5}H_{7}NO_{2}
Molar mass	113.116 g·mol^{−1}
Appearance	White to off-white crystalline powder
Density	1.127 g/mL
Melting point	66 to 69 °C (151 to 156 °F; 339 to 342 K) (also reported as 68–71 °C and 66–67 °C)
Boiling point	235 °C (455 °F; 508 K) (also reported as 234–235 °C)
Solubility in water	Soluble in water
Vapor pressure	0.0±0.5 mmHg at 25 °C (Predicted)

Hazards
- Occupational safety and health (OHS/OSH)
Main hazards	Irritant
- GHS labelling
Pictograms	(GHS07: Exclamation mark)
Signal word	Warning
Hazard statements	H315, H319, H335
Precautionary statements	P261, P264, P271, P280, P302+P352, P304+P340, P305+P351+P338, P312, P321, P332+P313, P337+P313, P362, P403+P233, P405, P501
Flash point	142.1(Predicted)
- Except where otherwise noted, data are given for materials in their standard state (at 25 °C [77 °F], 100 kPa). Infobox references

N-Methylsuccinimide (also known as 1-methyl-2,5-pyrrolidinedione, abbreviated MSI) is an organic compound chemically related to succinimide. It is primarily characterized as a major metabolic product of the industrial solvent N-methyl-2-pyrrolidone (NMP) in mammals, including humans and rats.

== Industrial production and use ==
One patent describes the reaction of aqueous ammonia and succinate with a methylating agent at temperatures ranging from 100 °C to 400 °C. The resulting N-methylsuccinimide can subsequently be purified and hydrogenated to form NMP. It can also be produced by the reaction of diammonium succinate with methanol or by the reaction of succinic anhydride with methylamine.

In the microelectronics industry, the oxidative degradation of NMP during fabrication processes results in the formation of N-methylsuccinimide. Consequently, it is found in waste NMP mixed liquors. Patents describe methods for purifying waste NMP by removing impurities such as N-methylsuccinimide and gamma-butyrolactone (GBL) using alkali treatment to recover high-purity NMP.

== Toxicokinetics ==
In toxicology and occupational health, N-methylsuccinimide is identified as a metabolite of NMP. Upon exposure to NMP, the compound undergoes a metabolic pathway in which it is first hydroxylated to form 5-hydroxy-N-methyl-2-pyrrolidone (5-HNMP). This intermediate is further oxidized to N-methylsuccinimide (MSI), which is subsequently metabolized to 2-hydroxy-N-methylsuccinimide (2-HMSI).

Experimental studies on male volunteers exposed to NMP vapors indicated that MSI levels in plasma and urine are correlated with exposure concentrations. However, 2-HMSI is often preferred as a biomarker due to its accumulation and delayed excretion profile. In human toxicokinetic studies, the renal clearance of MSI was calculated to be approximately 0.12 L/h, with a total clearance of 8.5 L/h. The apparent volume of distribution for MSI was found to be approximately 120 liters.

== Analysis and detection ==
Methods using gas chromatography (GC), sometimes coupled with mass spectrometry (GC-MS), have been used to analyze MSI in plasma and urine samples.

Solid-phase extraction (SPE) combined with gas chromatography and a flame thermionic detector (GC/FTD) has been developed for the determination of NMP and its metabolites, including MSI, in urine.

Studies evaluating biomarkers have employed mass spectrometry to analyze plasma and urine concentrations of MSI and related metabolites.
