= Amine gas treating =

Method of removing impurities from gases

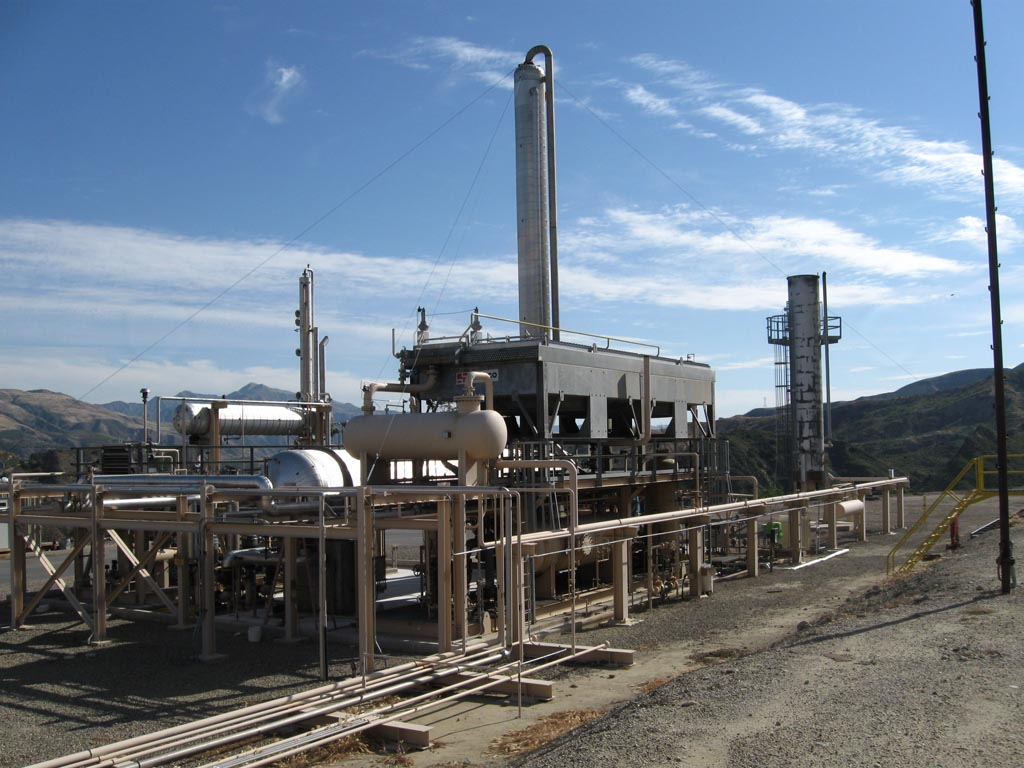
Amine gas plant at a natural gas field

Amine gas treating, also known as amine scrubbing, gas sweetening and acid gas removal, refers to a group of processes that use aqueous solutions of various alkylamines (commonly referred to simply as amines) to remove hydrogen sulfide (H_{2}S) and carbon dioxide (CO_{2}) from gases. It is a common unit process used in refineries, and is also used in petrochemical plants, natural gas processing plants and other industries.

Processes within oil refineries or chemical processing plants that remove hydrogen sulfide are referred to as "sweetening" processes because the odor of the processed products is improved by the absence of "sour" hydrogen sulfide. An alternative to the use of amines involves membrane technology. However, membrane separation is less attractive due to the relatively high capital and operating costs as well as other technical factors.

Many different amines are used in gas treating:

- Diethanolamine (DEA)
- Monoethanolamine (MEA)
- Methyldiethanolamine (MDEA)
- Diisopropanolamine (DIPA)
- Aminoethoxyethanol (Diglycolamine) (DGA)

The most commonly used amines in industrial plants are the alkanolamines DEA, MEA, and MDEA. These amines are also used in many oil refineries to remove sour gases from liquid hydrocarbons such as liquified petroleum gas (LPG).

== Description of a typical amine treater ==
Gases containing H_{2}S or both H_{2}S and CO_{2} are commonly referred to as sour gases or acid gases in the hydrocarbon processing industries.

The chemistry involved in the amine treating of such gases varies somewhat with the particular amine being used. For one of the more common amines, monoethanolamine (MEA) denoted as RNH_{2}, the acid-base reaction involving the protonation of the amine electron pair to form a positively charged ammonium group (RNH^{+}_{3}) can be expressed as:

RNH_{2} + H_{2}S ⇌ RNH^{+}_{3} + HS^{−}
RNH_{2} + H_{2}CO_{3} ⇌ RNH^{+}_{3} + HCO^{−}_{3}

The resulting dissociated and ionized species being more soluble in solution are trapped, or scrubbed, by the amine solution and so easily removed from the gas phase. At the outlet of the amine scrubber, the sweetened gas is thus depleted in H_{2}S and CO_{2}.

A typical amine gas treating process (the Girbotol process, as shown in the flow diagram below) includes an absorber unit and a regenerator unit as well as accessory equipment. In the absorber, the downflowing amine solution absorbs and reacts with H_{2}S and CO_{2} from the upflowing sour gas to produce a sweetened gas stream (i.e., a gas free of hydrogen sulfide and carbon dioxide) as a product and an amine solution rich in the absorbed acid gases. The resultant "rich" amine is then routed into the regenerator (a stripper with a reboiler) to produce regenerated or "lean" amine that is recycled for reuse in the absorber. The stripped overhead gas from the regenerator is concentrated H_{2}S and CO_{2}.

Process flow diagram of a typical amine treating process used in petroleum refineries, natural gas processing plants and other industrial facilities.

=== Alternative processes ===
Alternative stripper configurations include matrix, internal exchange, flashing feed, and multi-pressure with split feed. Many of these configurations offer more energy efficiency for specific solvents or operating conditions. Vacuum operation favors solvents with low heats of absorption while operation at normal pressure favors solvents with high heats of absorption. Solvents with high heats of absorption require less energy for stripping from temperature swing at fixed capacity. The matrix stripper recovers 40% of CO_{2} at a higher pressure and does not have inefficiencies associated with multi-pressure stripper. Energy and costs are reduced since the reboiler duty cycle is slightly less than normal pressure stripper. An Internal Exchange stripper has a smaller ratio of water vapor to CO_{2} in the overhead stream, and therefore less steam is required. The multi-pressure configuration with split feed reduces the flow into the bottom section, which also reduces the equivalent work. Flashing feed requires less heat input because it uses the latent heat of water vapor to help strip some of the CO_{2} in the rich stream entering the stripper at the bottom of the column. The multi-pressure configuration is more attractive for solvents with a higher heats of absorption.

== Amines ==
The amine concentration in the absorbent aqueous solution is an important parameter in the design and operation of an amine gas treating process. Depending on which one of the following four amines the unit was designed to use and what gases it was designed to remove, these are some typical amine concentrations, expressed as weight percent of pure amine in the aqueous solution:

- Monoethanolamine: About 20 % for removing H_{2}S and CO_{2}, and about 30 % for removing only CO_{2}, where the plant metallurgy is appropriate.
- Diethanolamine: About 25 to 35 % removing H_{2}S and CO_{2}
- Methyldiethanolamine: About 30 to 55 % for removing H_{2}S and CO_{2}
- Diglycolamine: About 40 to 50 % for removing H_{2}S and CO_{2}

The choice of amine concentration in the circulating aqueous solution depends upon several factors, involving the composition of the feed gas natural gas or petroleum refinery by-product gases that contain relatively low concentrations of both H_{2}S and CO_{2} or whether the unit is treating gases with a high percentage of CO_{2} such as the offgas from the steam reforming process used in ammonia production or the flue gases from power plants.

Both H_{2}S and CO_{2} are acid gases and hence corrosive to unprotected carbon steel. Their corrosiveness are greatly enhanced in the presence of moisture. However, in an amine treating unit, CO_{2} is a stronger acid than H_{2}S. Furthermore hydrogen sulfide can form a passivating film of iron sulfide that may act to protect the steel. When treating gases with a high percentage of CO_{2}, control of the CO_{2} loading in the amine is important to protect carbon steel from corrosion. Higher amine concentrations will have lower loading compared to lower concentrations at the same circulation rate.

Another factor involved in choosing the amine concentration is the relative solubility of H_{2}S and CO_{2} in the selected amine. The choice of the type of amine will affect the required circulation rate of amine solution, the energy consumption for the regeneration and the ability to selectively remove either H_{2}S alone or CO_{2} alone if desired. For more information about selecting the amine concentration, the reader is referred to Kohl and Nielsen's book.

=== MEA and DEA ===
MEA and DEA are primary and secondary amines. They are very reactive and can effectively remove a high volume of gas due to a high reaction rate. However, due to stoichiometry, the loading capacity is limited to 0.55 mol CO_{2} per mole of amine. MEA and DEA also require a large amount of energy to strip the CO_{2} during regeneration, which can be up to 70% of total operating costs. They are also more corrosive and chemically unstable compared to other amines if the concentration is excessive.

=== Other amines ===
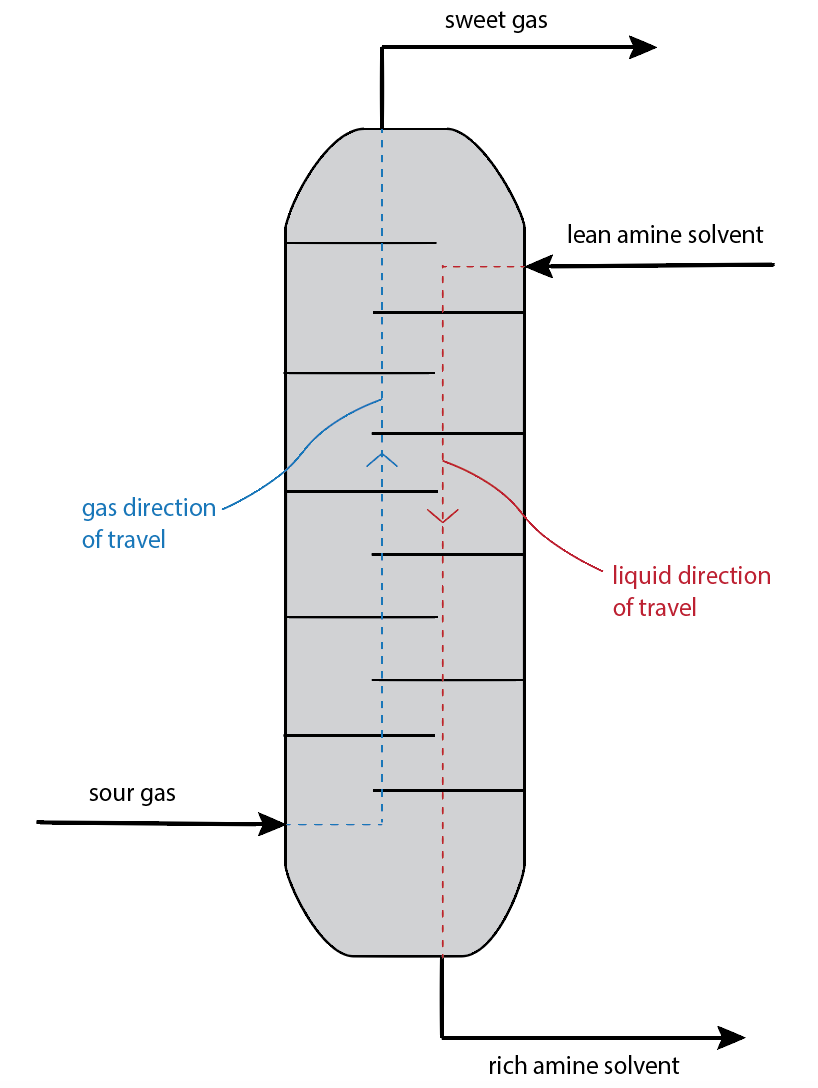
Simplified absorption column. Typical operating range: 35–50 °C and 5–205 atm of absolute pressure

Piperazines have been proposed for carbon capture and storage (CCS) because piperazine is very efficient at CO_{2} removal. The capabilities of piperazine are within the bounds of and thus favored for carbon capture. Piperazine can be thermally regenerated through multi-stage flash distillation and other methods after being used in operating temperatures up to 150 °C and recycled back into the absorption process, providing for higher overall energy performance in amine gas treating processes. Pilot plant studies have been conducted.

== Uses ==
In oil refineries, that stripped gas is mostly H_{2}S, much of which often comes from a sulfur-removing process called hydrodesulfurization. This H_{2}S-rich stripped gas stream is then usually routed into a Claus process to convert it into elemental sulfur. In fact, the vast majority of the 64,000,000 tonnes (63,000,000 long tons; 71,000,000 short tons) of sulfur produced worldwide in 2005 was byproduct sulfur from refineries and other hydrocarbon processing plants. Another sulfur-removing process is the WSA process which recovers sulfur in any form as concentrated sulfuric acid. In some plants, more than one amine absorber unit may share a common regenerator unit. The current emphasis on removing CO_{2} from the flue gases emitted by fossil fuel power plants has led to much interest in using amines for removing CO_{2} (see also: carbon capture and storage and conventional coal-fired power plant).

In the specific case of the industrial synthesis of ammonia, for the steam reforming process of hydrocarbons to produce gaseous hydrogen, amine treating is one of the commonly used processes for removing excess carbon dioxide in the final purification of the gaseous hydrogen.

In the biogas production it is sometimes necessary to remove carbon dioxide from the biogas to make it comparable with natural gas. The removal of the sometimes high content of hydrogen sulfide is necessary to prevent corrosion of metallic parts after burning the bio gas.

=== Carbon capture and storage ===
Amines are used to remove CO_{2} in various areas ranging from natural gas production to the food and beverage industry, and have been since 1930.

There are multiple classifications of amines, each of which has different characteristics relevant to CO_{2} capture. For example, monoethanolamine (MEA) reacts strongly with CO_{2} and has a fast reaction time and an ability to remove high percentages of CO_{2}, even at low CO_{2} concentrations. Typically, monoethanolamine (MEA) can capture 85% to 90% of the CO_{2} from the flue gas of a coal-fired plant, which is one of the most effective solvent to capture CO_{2}.

Challenges of carbon capture using amine include:

- Low pressure gas increases difficulty of transferring CO_{2} from the gas into amine
- Oxygen content of the gas can cause amine degradation and acid formation
- CO_{2} degradation of primary (and secondary) amines
- High energy consumption
- Very large facilities
- Finding a suitable location (enhanced oil recovery, deep saline aquifers, basaltic rocks...) to dispose of the removed CO_{2}

The partial pressure is the driving force to transfer CO_{2} into the liquid phase. Under low pressure, this transfer is hard to achieve without increasing the reboilers' heat duty, which will result in higher costs.

Primary and secondary amines, for example, MEA and DEA, will react with CO_{2} and form degradation products. O_{2} from the inlet gas will cause degradation as well. The degraded amine is no longer able to capture CO_{2}, which decreases the overall carbon capture efficiency.

Currently, a variety of amine mixtures are being synthesized and tested to achieve a more desirable set of overall properties for use in CO_{2} capture systems. One major focus is on lowering the energy required for solvent regeneration, which has a major impact on process costs. However, there are trade-offs to consider. For example, the energy required for regeneration is typically related to the driving forces for achieving high capture capacities. Thus, reducing the regeneration energy can lower the driving force and thereby increase the amount of solvent and size of absorber needed to capture a given amount of CO_{2}, thus, increasing the capital cost.

== See also ==
- Ammonia production
- Hydrodesulfurization
- WSA Process
- Claus process
- Selexol
- Rectisol
- Amine
- Ionic liquids in carbon capture
- Solid sorbents for carbon capture
