= Wet sulfuric acid process =

Gas desulfurization process

The wet sulfuric acid process (WSA process) is a gas desulfurization process introduced by Danish company Haldor Topsoe in 1987. The WSA process can be applied in all industries where sulfur removal presents an issue, and produces commercial quality sulfuric acid (H_{2}SO_{4}) and high-pressure steam during desulfurization.

The wet catalysis process is used for processing sulfur-containing streams, such as:

- H_{2}S gas from e.g. amine gas treating unit
- Off-gas from sour water stripper (SWS) gas
- Off-gas from Rectisol
- Spent acid from an alkylation unit
- Claus process tail gas
- Heavy residue or petcoke-fired utility boiler off-gas
- Boiler flue gases from various processes SNOX flue gas desulfurization
- Metallurgical process gas
- Production of sulfuric acid

== The process ==

The main reactions in the WSA process

- Combustion: 2 H_{2}S + 3 O_{2} ⇌ 2 H_{2}O + 2 SO_{2} (-1036 kJ/mol)
- Oxidation: 2 SO_{2} + O_{2} ⇌ 2 SO_{3} (-198 kJ/mol) [in the presence of a vanadium (V) oxide catalyst]
- Hydration: SO_{3} + H_{2}O ⇌ H_{2}SO_{4} (g) (-101 kJ/mol)
- Condensation: H_{2}SO_{4} (g) ⇌ H_{2}SO_{4} (l) (-90 kJ/mol)

The energy released by the above-mentioned reactions is used for steam production. Approximately 2–3 tons of high-pressure steam are produced per ton of acid.

== Industrial applications ==
Industries where WSA process plants are installed:

- Refinery and petrochemical industry
- Metallurgy industry
- Coal-based industry (coking and gasification)
- Power industry
- Viscose industry
- Sulfuric acid industry

== WSA for gasifiers ==
The acid gas exiting a Rectisol-, Selexol-, amine gas treating unit or other similar units installed after the gasifier contains H_{2}S, COS and hydrocarbons in addition to CO_{2}. In order to prevent the emission of SO_{2} into the environment, the acid gas can be purified via the WSA process. The WSA process is resource-efficient, providing a high sulfur recovery while producing superheated steam with the excess heat generated, which can be recirculated and reused.

=== Examples of WSA process for gasification ===
Example 1:

- Feed-gas flow: 14,000 Nm^{3}/h
- Composition [vol %]: 5.8% H_{2}S, 1.2% COS, 9.7% HC and 77.4% CO_{2}
- SOx concentration [vol %]: 1.58%
- H_{2}SO_{4} production: 106 MTPD
- Steam production: 53 ton/h
- Cooling water consumption: 8 m^{3}/ton acid (delta T = 10 °C)
- Fuel consumption: 1,000 Nm^{3}/h (LHV = 2,821 kcal/Nm^{3})

Example 2: A sulfur plant in China will be built in connection with an ammonia plant, producing 500 kilotons/year of ammonia for fertilizer production.

== Spent acid regeneration and production of sulfuric acid ==
The WSA process can also be used for the production of sulfuric acid from sulfur burning or regeneration of the spent acid from e.g., alkylation plants. Wet catalysis processes differ from other contact sulfuric acid processes in that the feed gas contains excess moisture when it comes into contact with the catalyst. The sulfur trioxide formed by catalytic oxidation of the sulfur dioxide reacts instantly with the moisture to produce sulfuric acid in the vapor phase to an extent determined by the temperature. Liquid acid is subsequently formed by condensation of the sulfuric acid vapor and not by the absorption of the sulfur trioxide in concentrated sulfuric acid, as in contact processes based on dry gases.

The concentration of the product acid depends on the H_{2}O:SO_{3} ratio in the catalytically converted gases and on the condensation temperature.

The combustion gases are cooled to the converter inlet temperature of about 420–440 °C. Processing these wet gases in a conventional cold-gas contact process (DCDA) plant would necessitate cooling and drying of the gas to remove all moisture. As such, the WSA process is relatively cost-efficient under most circumstances.

About 80% to 85% of the world’s sulfur production is used in sulfuric acid production. 50% of the world’s sulfuric acid production is used in fertilizer production, mainly to convert phosphates to water-soluble forms, according to the Fertilizer Manual published jointly by the United Nations Industrial Development Organization (UNIDO) and the International Fertilizer Development Center.
