= Acid gas =

Gas with acidic pH

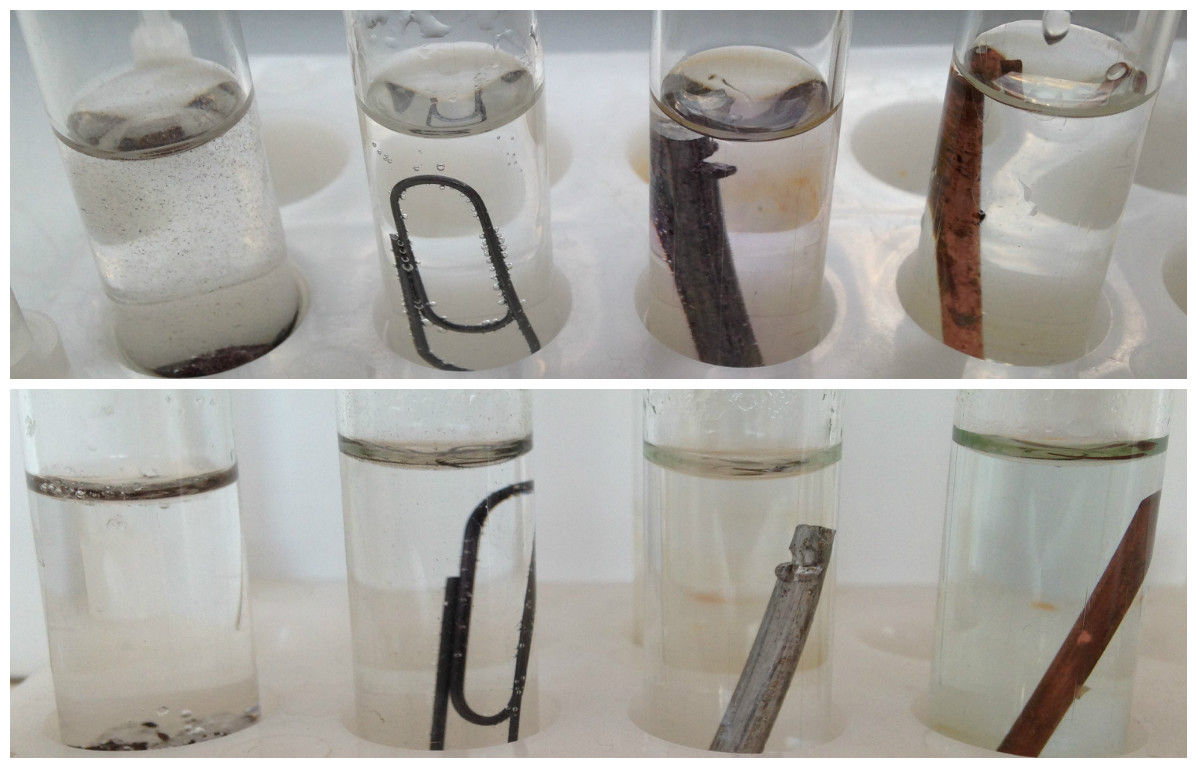
From the left to the right: zinc, iron, aluminium, copper; immersed in acetic acid. Above shows the initial chemical reaction with below showing results after 24 hours, with the vials containing acidic gas.

Acid gas is a particular typology of natural gas or any other gas mixture containing significant quantities of hydrogen sulfide (H_{2}S), carbon dioxide (CO_{2}), or similar acidic gases. A gas is determined to be acidic or not after it is mixed with water. The pH scale ranges from 0 to 14; anything above 7 is basic while anything below 7 is acidic. Water has a neutral pH of 7, so once a gas is mixed with water, if the resulting mixture has a pH of less than 7, it is an acidic gas; if the pH is more than 7, it is an alkaline gas.

The term/s acid gas and sour gas are often incorrectly treated as synonyms. Strictly speaking, a sour gas is any gas that specifically contains hydrogen sulfide in significant amounts; an acid gas is any gas that contains significant amounts of acidic gases such as carbon dioxide (CO_{2}) or hydrogen sulfide. Thus, carbon dioxide by itself is an acid gas but not a sour gas.

== Dangers of acid gas ==
Once a process burns a gas containing an acidic mixture, that acid gas is released into the atmosphere. This causes one of manufacturing's most detrimental effects on the environment, acid rain. The acidic gases burned from one power plant can travel hundreds of miles after the gas mixes with water molecules in the atmosphere. The compounds then fall to the earth again in different forms of precipitation (acid rain) and can cause respiratory health issues in humans, kill plants and wildlife, erode structures and buildings, and contaminate water sources.

Acid gases are also hazardous in other ways than polluting the environment. Acid gases can be extremely flammable and explosive under pressure, so must be kept away from heat, sparks, or open flames.

Hydrogen sulfide is a toxic gas, it can cause breathing problems, asphyxiation and death. It also is very corrosive to metals which restricts the materials that can be used for piping and other equipment for handling sour gas, as many metals are sensitive to sulfide stress cracking.

Carbon dioxide at concentrations of 7% to 10.1% causes dizziness, headache, visual and hearing dysfunction, and unconsciousness within a few minutes to an hour. Concentrations above 17% are lethal when exposed for more than one minute.

== Processing and safety ==
Before a raw natural gas containing hydrogen sulfide and/or carbon dioxide can be used, the raw gas must be treated to reduce impurities to acceptable levels and this is commonly done with an amine gas treating process. There are physical and chemical absorption processes to removing the toxic properties of these gases, both of which involve the syngas being washed with a lean solvent in an absorber to remove the H_{2}S. Once the toxic gas leaves the bottom of the absorber it is sent to a regenerator where the solution is further stripped with steam under extremely lower pressures to remover the sulfur from the gas. The removed H_{2}S is most often subsequently converted to by-product elemental sulfur in a Claus process or alternatively converted to valuable sulfuric acid in a WSA Process unit.

Processes within oil refineries or natural-gas processing plants that remove mercaptans and/or hydrogen sulfide are commonly referred to as 'sweetening' processes because they result in products which no longer have the sour, foul odors of mercaptans and hydrogen sulfide.

== See also ==
- Oil refinery
- Rectisol
- Selexol
