= Triethylene glycol =

Names
- Preferred IUPAC name 2,2′-[Ethane-1,2-diylbis(oxy)]di(ethan-1-ol)
- Other names 2-[2-(2-Hydroxyethoxy)ethoxy]ethanol; Triglycol

Identifiers
CAS Number	112-27-6
3D model (JSmol)	Interactive image
Abbreviations	TEG
Beilstein Reference	969357
ChEBI	CHEBI:44926
ChEMBL	ChEMBL1235259
ChemSpider	13835895
ECHA InfoCard	100.003.594
EC Number	203-953-2
Gmelin Reference	260942
PubChem CID	8172
RTECS number	YE4550000
UNII	3P5SU53360
CompTox Dashboard (EPA)	DTXSID4021393
- InChI: InChI=1S/C6H14O4/c7-1-3-9-5-6-10-4-2-8/h7-8H,1-6H2 Key: ZIBGPFATKBEMQZ-UHFFFAOYSA-N; InChI=1/C6H14O4/c7-1-3-9-5-6-10-4-2-8/h7-8H,1-6H2 Key: ZIBGPFATKBEMQZ-UHFFFAOYAS
- SMILES: OCCOCCOCCO

Properties
Chemical formula	C_{6}H_{14}O_{4}
Molar mass	150.174 g·mol^{−1}
Appearance	Colorless liquid
Density	1.1255 g/mL
Melting point	−7 °C (19 °F; 266 K)
Boiling point	285 °C (545 °F; 558 K)

Hazards
NFPA 704 (fire diamond)	1 1 0

Related compounds
Related diols	Ethylene glycol; Diethylene glycol; Polyethylene glycol
- Except where otherwise noted, data are given for materials in their standard state (at 25 °C [77 °F], 100 kPa). verify (what is ?) Infobox references

Triethylene glycol, TEG, or triglycol is a colorless odorless viscous liquid with molecular formula HOCH_{2}CH_{2}OCH_{2}CH_{2}OCH_{2}CH_{2}OH. It is used as a plasticizer for vinyl polymers. It is also used in air sanitizer products, such as "Oust" or "Clean and Pure". When aerosolized it acts as a disinfectant. Glycols are also used as liquid desiccants for natural gas and in air conditioning systems. It is used as an additive for hydraulic fluids and brake fluids, and as a base for "smoke machine" fluid in the entertainment industry.

== Properties ==
Triethylene glycol is a member of a homologous series of polyethylene glycols. It is a colorless, odorless and stable liquid with high viscosity and a high boiling point. Apart from its use as a raw material in the manufacture and synthesis of other products, TEG is known for its hygroscopic quality and its ability to dehumidify fluids. This liquid is miscible with water, and at standard atmospheric pressure (101.325 kPa) has a boiling point of 286.5 °C and a freezing point of −7 °C. It is also soluble in ethanol, acetone, acetic acid, glycerine, pyridine, aldehydes; slightly soluble in diethyl ether; and insoluble in oil, fat and most hydrocarbons.

== Preparation ==
TEG is prepared commercially as a co-product of the oxidation of ethylene at high temperature in the presence of silver oxide catalyst, followed by hydration of ethylene oxide to yield mono(one)-, di(two)-, tri(three)- and tetraethylene glycols.

== Applications ==
TEG is used by the oil and gas industry to "dehydrate" natural gas. It may also be used to dehydrate other gases, including CO_{2}, H_{2}S, and other oxygenated gases. It is necessary to dry natural gas to a certain point, as humidity in natural gas can cause pipelines to freeze, and create other problems for end users of the natural gas. Triethylene glycol is placed into contact with natural gas, and strips the water out of the gas. Triethylene glycol is heated to a high temperature and put through a condensing system, which removes the water as waste and reclaims the TEG for continuous reuse within the system. The waste TEG produced by this process has been found to contain enough benzene to be classified as hazardous waste (benzene concentration greater than 0.5 mg/L).

Triethylene glycol is well established as a relatively mild disinfectant toward a variety of bacteria, influenza A viruses and spores of Penicillium notatum fungi. However, its exceptionally low toxicity, broad materials compatibility, and low odor combined with its antimicrobial properties indicates that it approaches the ideal for air disinfection purposes in occupied spaces. Much of the scientific work with triethylene glycol was done in the 1940s and 1950s, however that work has ably demonstrated the antimicrobial activity against airborne, solution suspension, and surface bound microbes. The ability of triethylene glycol to inactivate Streptococcus pneumoniae (original citation: pneumococcus Type I), Streptococcus pyogenes (original citation: Beta hemolytic streptococcus group A) and Influenza A virus in the air was first reported in 1943. Since the first report the following microorganisms have been reported in the literature to be inactivated in the air: Penicillium notatum spores, Chlamydophila psittaci (original citation: meningopneumonitis virus strain Cal 10 and psittacosis virus strain 6BC), Group C streptococcus, type 1 pneumococcus, Staphylococcus albus, Escherichia coli, and Serratia marcescens Bizio (ATCC 274). Solutions of triethylene glycol are known to be antimicrobial toward suspensions of Penicillium notatum spores, Streptococcus pyogenes (original citation: Beta hemolytic streptococcus Group A), Streptococcus pneumoniae (original citation: pneumococcus Type I), Streptococcus viridans, and Mycobacterium bovis (original citation: tubercle bacilli Ravenel bovine-type). Further, the inactivation of H1N1 influenza A virus on surfaces has been demonstrated. The latter investigation suggests that triethylene glycol may prove to be a potent weapon against future influenza epidemics and pandemics. However, at least some viruses, including Pseudomonas phage phi6 become more infectious when treated with triethylene glycol.

== Safety ==
According to the European Chemicals Agency (ECHA), no hazards have been classified. https://echa.europa.eu/es/substance-information/-/substanceinfo/100.003.594
