= Claus process =

Gas desulfurizing process

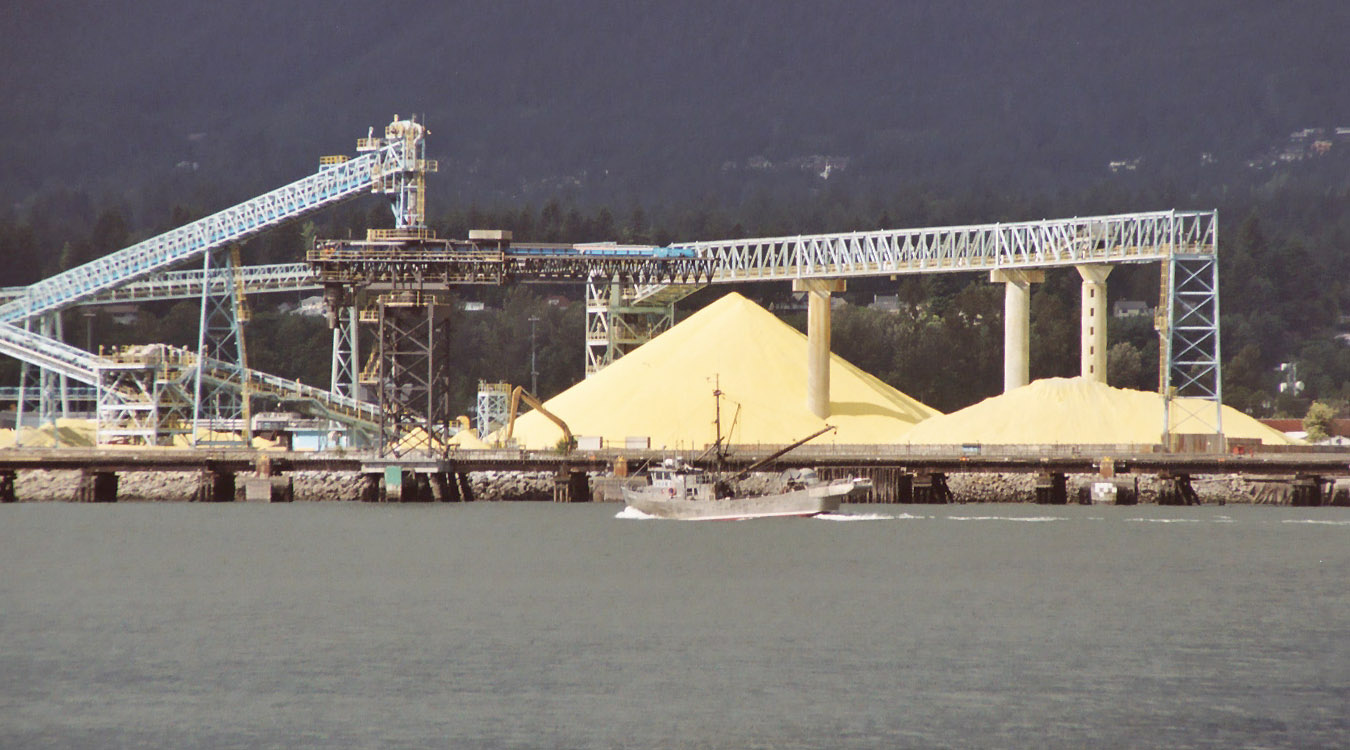
Piles of sulfur produced in Alberta by the Claus process awaiting shipment at docks in Vancouver, Canada.

The Claus process is a desulfurizing process, recovering elemental sulfur from gaseous mixtures containing hydrogen sulfide (H_{2}S). First patented in 1883 by the chemist Carl Friedrich Claus, the Claus process remains the most important desulfurization process in the petrochemicals industry. It is standard at oil refineries, natural gas processing plants, and gasification or synthesis gas plants. In 2005, byproduct sulfur from hydrocarbon-processing facilities constituted the vast majority of the 64 teragrams (64 million metric tons) of sulfur produced worldwide.

The overall Claus process reaction is described by the following equation:

2 H_{2}S + O_{2} → 2 S + 2 H_{2}O

However, the process occurs in two steps:

2 H_{2}S + 3 O_{2} → 2 SO_{2} + 2 H_{2}O
4 H_{2}S + 2 SO_{2} → 3 S_{2} + 4 H_{2}O

Moreover, the input feedstock is usually a mixture of gases, containing hydrogen cyanide, hydrocarbons, sulfur dioxide or ammonia. The mixture may begin as raw natural gas, or output from physical and chemical gas treatment units (Selexol, Rectisol, Purisol and amine scrubbers) when e.g. refining crude oil.

Gases containing over 25% H_{2}S are suitable for the recovery of sulfur in straight-through Claus plants. Gases with less than 25% H_{2}S can be processed through alternate configurations such as a split flow, or feed and air preheating.

== History ==
The process was invented by Carl Friedrich Claus, a German chemist working in England. A British patent was issued to him in 1883. The process was later significantly modified by IG Farben.

== Process description ==
A schematic process flow diagram of a basic 2+1-reactor (converter) SuperClaus unit is shown below:

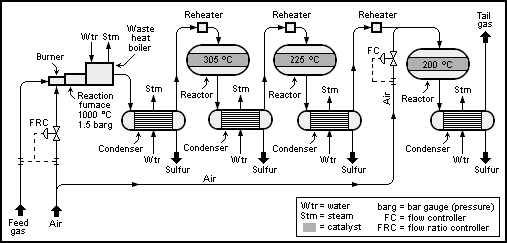
Schematic flow diagram of a straight-through, 3 reactor (converter), Claus sulfur recovery unit.

The Claus technology can be divided into two process steps, thermal and catalytic.

=== Thermal step ===
In the thermal step, hydrogen sulfide-laden gas burns in a substoichiometric combustion at temperatures above 850 °C. The process requires careful control of the fuel-air ratio. To ensure a stoichiometric Claus reaction in the catalytic step, only 1/3 of the hydrogen sulfide (H_{2}S) content should convert to SO_{2}.

A Claus facility usually maintains several separate fires in lances surrounding a central muffle to handle different gas sources. The concentration of H_{2}S and other combustible components (hydrocarbons or ammonia) then determine how the feed gas is burned.

Claus gases with no further combustible contents besides H_{2}S (acid gas) burn in the lances by the following chemical reaction:

2 H_{2}S + 3 O_{2} → 2 SO_{2} + 2 H_{2}O (ΔH = −518 kJ mol^{−1})

This is a strongly exothermic, free-flame oxidation of hydrogen sulfide, generating sulfur dioxide.

The central muffle itself burns gas mixtures containing ammonia (from a refinery's sour water stripper) or hydrocarbons. Sufficient air is injected into the muffle for the complete combustion of all hydrocarbons and ammonia, and the temperature is often maintained above 1050 °C. The high temperature destroys BTEX (Benzene, Toluene, Ethylbenzene and Xylene) mixtures, which otherwise would poison the downstream Claus catalyst.

To reduce the process gas volume or obtain higher combustion temperatures, the air requirement can also be covered by injecting oxygen. Several technologies utilizing oxygen enrichment are available in industry, but require a special burner in the reaction furnace.

The Claus reaction continues downstream, as more hydrogen sulfide (H_{2}S) reacts with the SO_{2}, to produce gaseous, elemental sulfur:

2 H_{2}S + SO_{2} → 3 S + 2 H_{2}O (ΔH = −1165.6 kJ mol^{−1})

The sulfur forms in the thermal phase as highly reactive S_{2} diradicals which combine exclusively to the S_{8} allotrope:

4 S_{2} → S_{8}

Usually, 60 to 70% of the total amount of elemental sulfur produced in the process is already present at the conclusion of the thermal process step.

==== Side reactions ====
Other chemical processes taking place in the thermal step of the Claus reaction are:

- The formation of hydrogen gas:

2 H_{2}S → S_{2} + 2 H_{2} (ΔH > 0)
CH_{4} + 2 H_{2}O → CO_{2} + 4 H_{2}

- The formation of carbonyl sulfide:

H_{2}S + CO_{2} → S=C=O + H_{2}O

- The formation of carbon disulfide:

CH_{4} + 2 S_{2} → S=C=S + 2 H_{2}S

=== Catalytic step ===
The waste stream from the thermal step is initially cooled to precipitate the sulfur, similar to the post-catalytic cooling discussed below. Further treatment with an activated aluminum(III) or titanium(IV) oxide catalyst then boosts the sulfur yield. One suggested mechanism is that S_{6} and S_{8} desorb from the catalyst's active sites with simultaneous formation of stable cyclic elemental sulfur.

Catalytic treatment is normally repeated a maximum of three times. Where an incineration or tail-gas treatment unit (TGTU) is added downstream of the Claus plant, only two catalytic stages are usually installed.

The catalytic recovery of sulfur consists of three substeps: heating, catalytic reaction and cooling plus condensation. Reheating the gas prevents sulfur condensation in the catalyst bed, which fouls the catalyst. Several industrial methods achieve the required bed operating temperature:

- Hot-gas bypass: mixing in bypass gas direct from the waste-heat boiler.
- Indirect steam reheaters: a heat exchanger consuming high-pressure steam.
- Gas/gas exchangers: a heat exchanger cooling the hot gas from an upstream catalytic reactor.
- Direct-fired heaters: fired reheaters burning acid gas or fuel gas substoichiometrically to prevent oxygen breakthrough

The typically recommended operating temperature of the first catalyst stage is 315 °C to 330 °C (bottom bed temperature). The high temperature hydrolyzes COS and CS_{2}, combustion byproducts that are otherwise inert during the modified Claus process. For subsequent stages, the catalytic conversion is maximized at lower temperatures, but care must be taken to remain above sulfur's dew point. The operating temperatures of the subsequent catalytic stages are typically 240 °C for the second stage and 200 °C for the third stage (bottom bed temperatures).

After each catalytic pass, the process gas cools in the sulfur condenser to between 150 and 130 °C, whereupon the sulfur formed condenses. The waste heat and the condensation heat are captured as medium or low-pressure steam. The condensed sulfur is removed through a liquid outlet.

Before storage, liquid sulfur streams pass a degassing unit, which removes gases (primarily H_{2}S) dissolved in the sulfur.

The tail gas from the Claus process still contains combustible components and sulfur compounds (H_{2}S, H_{2} and CO). It either burns in an incineration unit or is further desulfurized in a downstream tail gas treatment unit.

=== Sub dew point Claus process ===
The conventional Claus process described above is limited in its conversion due to the reaction equilibrium being reached. Like all exothermic reactions, greater conversion can be achieved at lower temperatures, however as mentioned the Claus reactor must be operated above the sulfur dew point (120–150 °C) to avoid liquid sulfur physically deactivating the catalyst. To overcome this problem, the sub dew point Clauss reactors are oriented in parallel, with one operating and one spare. When one reactor has become saturated with adsorbed sulfur, the process flow is diverted to the standby reactor. The reactor is then regenerated by sending process gas that has been heated to 300–350 °C to vaporize the sulfur. This stream is sent to a condenser to recover the sulfur.

== Process performance ==
Over 2.6 tons of steam will be generated for each ton of sulfur yield.

The physical properties of elemental sulfur obtained in the Claus process can differ from that obtained by other processes. In the Claus process, sulfur is usually transported as a liquid (melting point 115 °C). In elemental sulfur, viscosity increases rapidly at temperatures in excess of 160 °C due to the formation of polymeric sulfur chains.

Another anomaly is the solubility of residual H_{2}S in liquid sulfur as a function of temperature. Ordinarily, the solubility of a gas decreases with increasing temperature but H_{2}S behaves inversely. This means that toxic and explosive H_{2}S gas can build up in the headspace of any cooling liquid sulfur reservoir. The explanation for this anomaly is the endothermic reaction of sulfur with H_{2}S to polysulfanes H_{2}S_{x}.

== Sulfur stockpile ==
Millions of tons of elemental sulfur are produced worldwide by the Claus process each year.

Owing to the high sulfur content of the Athabasca Oil Sands, stockpiles of elemental sulfur from this process now exist throughout Alberta, Canada.

Another way of storing sulfur, while reusing it as a valuable material, is as a binder for concrete, the resulting product having many desirable properties (see sulfur concrete).

== See also ==
- Amine treating
- Hydro-desulfurization
- Crystasulf
- Hydrogenation
- Acid gas
- Sour gas
