= Sour gas =

Term for gas with significant amounts of hydrogen sulfide

Sour gas is natural gas or any other gas containing significant amounts of hydrogen sulfide (H_{2}S).

Natural gas is usually considered sour if there are more than 5.7 milligrams of H_{2}S per cubic meter of natural gas, which is equivalent to approximately 4 ppm by volume under standard temperature and pressure. However, this threshold varies by country, state, or even agency or application. For instance, the Texas Railroad Commission considers a sour gas pipeline one that carries gas over 100 ppm by volume of H_{2}S. However, the Texas Commission on Environmental Quality has historically defined sour gas for upstream operations – which requires permitting, reporting, and possibly additional emission controls – as gas that contains more than 24 ppm by volume. Natural gas that does not contain significant amounts of hydrogen sulfide is called "sweet gas".

Although the terms "acid gas" and "sour gas" are sometimes used interchangeably, strictly speaking, a sour gas is any gas that specifically contains hydrogen sulfide in significant amounts, whereas an acid gas is any gas that contains significant amounts of acidic gases such as carbon dioxide (CO_{2}) or hydrogen sulfide. Thus, carbon dioxide by itself is an acid gas, not a sour gas. In addition to being toxic, hydrogen sulfide in the presence of water also damages piping and other equipment handling sour gas by sulfide stress cracking. Natural gas typically contains several ppm of volatile sulfur compounds, but gas from one well in Canada is known to contain 90% hydrogen sulfide and others may have H_{2}S contents in the tens of percent range.

== Methods for sweetening ==
Within oil refineries or natural gas processing plants, the removal of hydrogen sulfide and other organosulfur compounds is referred to as "sweetening". The sweetened product lacks the sour, foul odors of mercaptans and hydrogen sulfide.

Before raw natural gas containing hydrogen sulfide or carbon dioxide can be used, the raw gas must be treated to remove those impurities to acceptable levels, commonly by an amine treatment process. The removed H_{2}S is most often subsequently converted to by-product elemental sulfur in a Claus process or it can be treated in a wet sulfuric acid process unit where the by-product is sulfuric acid. Alternatively, the highly concentrated H_{2}S gas, the by-product of the amine treatment plant, can be recompressed by gas compressor units specifically designed to handle highly toxic gas and injected back in the reservoir. In addition to utilizing an amine or Claus process, liquid redox is becoming increasingly popular. Another product removed during sweetening is carbonyl sulfide.

== See also ==
- Rectisol
- Shah gas field, Abu Dhabi
