= Shell Haven =

Port in Essex, England

Coordinates: 51.5052°N 0.4902°E

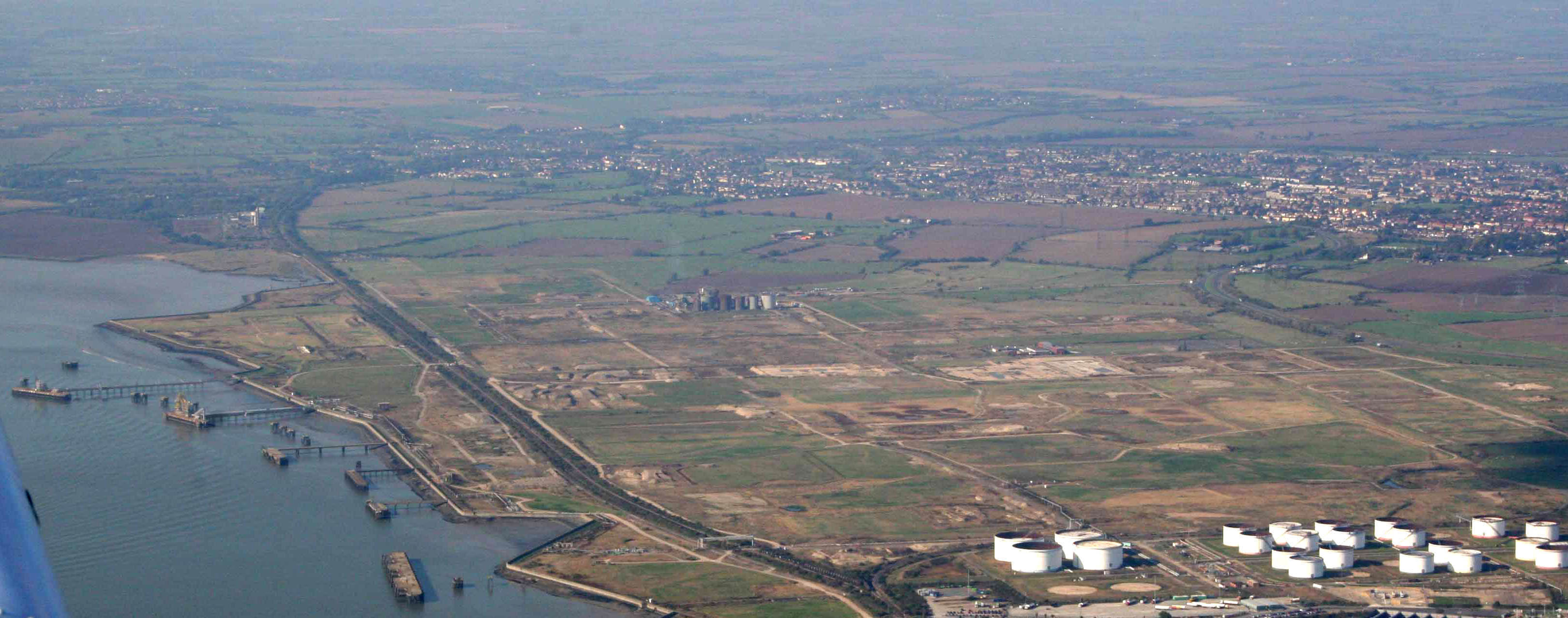
- Aerial view of Shell Haven 19 October 2007

- Location within Essex
- OS grid reference: TQ728815
- Unitary authority: Thurrock
- Ceremonial county: Essex
- Region: East
- Country: England
- Sovereign state: United Kingdom
- Post town: STANFORD-LE-HOPE
- Postcode district: SS17
- Dialling code: 01375
- Police: Essex
- Fire: Essex
- Ambulance: East of England
- UK Parliament: Basildon

Shell Haven was a port on the north bank of the Thames Estuary at the eastern end of Thurrock, Essex, England, and then an oil refinery. The refinery closed in 1999 and the site was purchased by DP World, who received planning consent in May 2007 for the new London Gateway deep-water container port at the site. The neighbouring Coryton Refinery remained in operation until 2012.

== History ==
Shell Haven appears on the 1596 edition of Saxton's Map Essexiae Comitat' Nova vera ac absaluta descriptio It was possibly mentioned earlier. Shell Haven was mentioned in Samuel Pepys' Diary on 10 June 1667.

The site, historically also referred to as Shellhaven, was originally an inlet on the north bank of the Thames, about a mile to the west of Canvey Island. This was the mouth of Shell Haven Creek, which runs east and south of the village of Fobbing, and originally separated Corringham Marsh from Fobbing Marsh. To the east was Shell Haven House. Sources differ on when Shell Haven first became associated with the oil industry; the first edition Ordnance Survey map of the early 19th century shows Oil Mill Farm a mile or so up Shell Haven Creek. Shell Haven was for over 80 years the site of a large Shell oil refinery, but there seems to be no evidence for the company taking its name from the site.

Thames Haven Dock Company's Act 1856
- Act of Parliament
- Parliament of the United Kingdom
- Long title: An Act for the making of a Dock and Works at Thames Haven, and for other Purposes.
- Citation: 19 & 20 Vict. c. cxix

Dates
- Royal assent: 21 July 1856

Text of statute as originally enacted

In the 1850s, a branch line was constructed from the London Tilbury and Southend Railway (LT&SR) to a new port immediately to the east of Shell Haven, to be known as Thames Haven (sometimes written Thameshaven). The name of Shell Haven would probably have been eclipsed, but for the failure of Thames Haven to prosper, and the later arrival of Shell.

In 1895, the ammunition firm Kynochs purchased Borley Farm, to the east of Shell Haven Creek, to build an explosives factory. This opened in 1897, with a small estate called Kynochtown. Kynochs also built the Corringham Light Railway (CLR), with a passenger branch from the works to Corringham and a goods branch to the LT&SR at Thames Haven. The Kynoch works closed in 1919. The site and CLR were taken over by coal merchants Cory Brothers of Cardiff to build an oil-storage depot, with Kynochtown being renamed Coryton. The oil depot eventually became Coryton Refinery (run from 1950 until recently by Mobil and its antecedents), which remains in production, between Shell Haven Creek and Hole Haven to the east.

Shell Oil first arrived in the form of the Asiatic Petroleum Company, a sales company formed by Royal Dutch Petroleum and the British company Shell Transport and Trading Company, prior to their merger as Royal Dutch Shell. A licence was obtained in 1912 to store petroleum at Shell Haven, in iron tanks, each containing not more than 4,000 tonnes. The maximum storage allowed for the whole site was 80,000 tonnes. Refinery operations began on a 40-hectare (99-acre) site in 1916 with a distillation plant that produced fuel oil for the Admiralty. In 1919, this unit was converted to manufacture road-surfacing bitumen. In 1925, a bench still was erected for the manufacture of lubricating oils; the first high viscosity oils were produced in 1937. Other plants were erected before the outbreak of war, including a blending plant for producing horticultural chemical products.

During World War II, the refineries and oil storage tanks at Thames Haven, Shell Haven, and Coryton became a sitting target for air raids, notably in September 1940, during the Battle of Britain.

In 1946, a plant producing high-grade paraffin wax for candles, paper, etc. was commissioned. In 1947, expansion began on a 400-hectare (990-acre) site west of the original refinery.

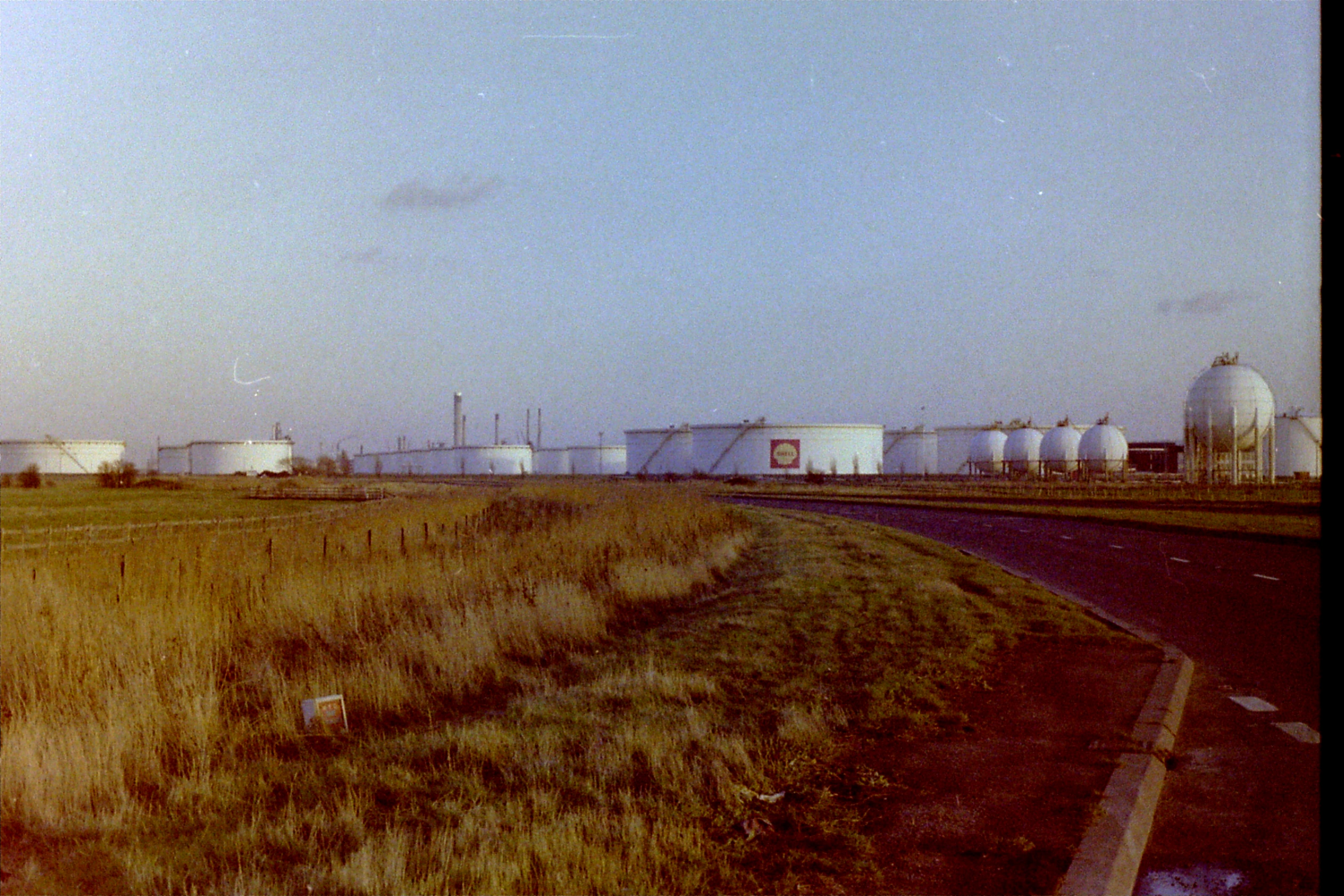
Shell Haven refinery tank farm 1980

In 1948, financial sanction was approved by the board of Shell Petroleum Co Ltd for the construction of a new large crude-oil refinery, based primarily on the processing of Kuwait crude. The facilities were to include:

- A crude distillation unit, with a design intake of 6,000 tonnes/day of Kuwait crude. It was given the designation CDU1.
- A high-vacuum unit with a design intake of 3,500 tonnes/day of Kuwait long residue. Designated HVU for CCF (cat cracker feed).
- A thermal reformer with a design intake of 1,200 tonnes/day Kuwait naphtha.
- A gasoline doctor treater
- Three 17-bar steam boilers (MP Boilers 3, 5, and 6) and a once-through salt cooling water system.

In 1950, the crude distillation unit, the doctor treater, and MP Boilers 3, 5, and 6 were commissioned.

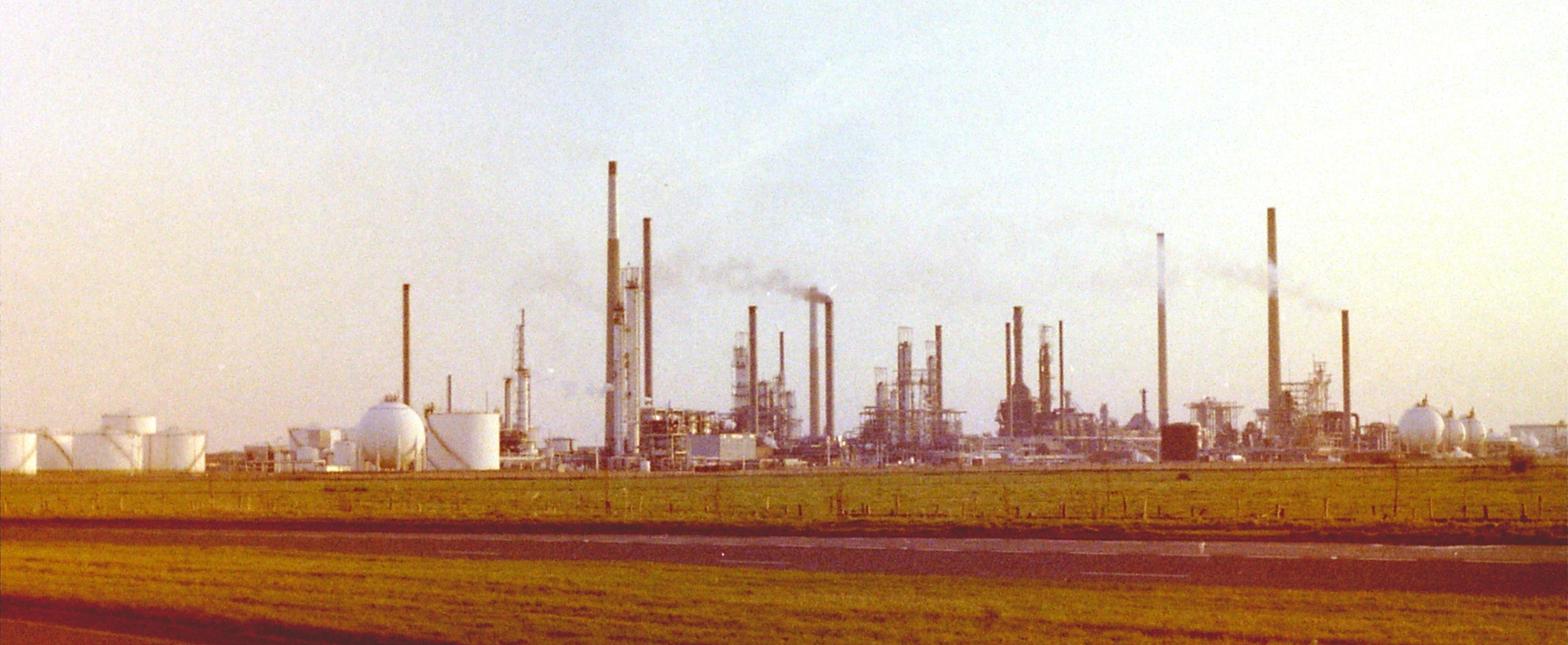
Shell Haven oil refinery Essex 1980

Subsequently, various units were added to produce valuable hydrocarbons from the distillation residue. In 1956, a catalytic reforming "platformer" was brought into service, and in the same year, a petroleum chemicals unit to manufacture alkylbenzenes, the basis of household detergents. A second crude distillation unit was commissioned in 1959, and a second catalytic reformer in 1967. A kerosene hydrotreater was commissioned in 1972, and in 1977 a third reformer. In 1979, a hydrocracking unit was added to increase the proportion of light distillates. A new bitumen plant started production in 1981.

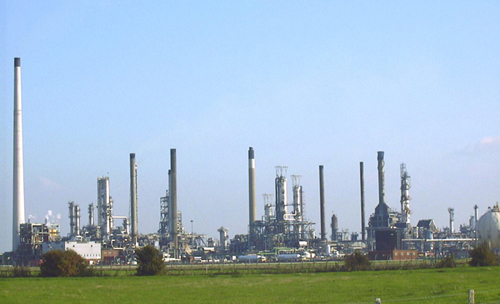
Shell Haven Refinery shortly before decommissioning in 1999.

In 1992, a major capital investment was completed, adding a "naphtha minus" complex, which contained an isomerisation unit, benzene recovery, and gas-turbine power generation. A new control centre was added. By then the plant had a capacity of 4.6 million tonnes per year, and covered 800 hectares (2,000 acres), with a 27-kilometre (17-mile) perimeter and its own generating plant, emergency services, and other services. It had five jetties, handling tankers of up to 300,000 tons capacity. The refinery delivered products by road and ship and UK oil pipeline network.

=== Incidents ===
In the period of 1970–1973, major fires broke out at the refinery three times.

=== Closure and decommissioning ===
The Shell refinery closed in 1999. A team consisting of operations and engineering personnel were picked from the workforce to carry out decommissioning and oversee the demolition of the refinery. Shell Haven Refinery was decommissioned and demolished, apart from the bitumen plant and some storage tanks. The two reactors from the hydrocracker unit were transferred to the Shell Rhineland Refinery in Cologne, Germany, in July 2004 and added to an already-existing unit of four crackers of the same type. The two Shellhaven reactors continued operation in 2005 and are operational until today.

In 2006, the site was purchased by DP World, one of the largest marine terminal operators in the world, as part of the company's purchase of P&O. In May 2007, DP World received outline planning consent for a major new deepwater port on the site, known as London Gateway. In addition to the new port, the development will include one of Europe's largest logistics parks, providing access to London, the South East, and the rest of the UK.

In May 2008, the Department for Transport issued a "Harbour Empowerment Order" for London Gateway, which provided official and statutory powers for the new port and established London Gateway as a legally recognised authority. DP World is now set to invest over £1.5B to develop the project over the next 10 to 15 years.

The bitumen unit was in the process of being decommissioned in 2010.

The site is currently being remediated by Hydrock as part of the redevelopment to an industrial and distribution park.

== Shell Haven Refinery ==
The Refinery was used as a location in the film Quatermass 2.

| Crude Oil Tanks; The crude that was brought in by oil tankers was then pumped into 100,000-ton-capacity tanks seen in the back of the photo. The buildings in front of the tanks were the refinery Workshops and Stores. |

| Crude Distiller 1 Crude was brought in by oil tankers to the jetties, usually B Jetty. This was then pumped into 100,000-ton-capacity tanks. Once the tanks had been checked for water it was then pumped to the crude distiller. It was passed through a desalter unit, which washed out salt from the crude oil before it entered the distillation unit. The distiller produced long residue, waxy distillate, butane, propane, kerosene, gas oil (Heavy and Medium), and naphtha. Methane and other waste gases produced went to the refinery flare system to be recovered and burnt as fuel in the refinery furnaces. |

| High Vacuum Unit The high-vacuum unit was originally designed to process 3,500 tonnes/day of Kuwait long residue. The vacuum was produced using steam ejectors with salt cooling water condensers. The HVU produced three streams: short residue, waxy distillate, and blowing flux. Short residue was either feed for the bitumen or used to blend fuel oil. Blowing flux was used in the production of blown bitumen. In later years, the HVU run on North Sea long residue. When the hydrocracker was commissioned in 1979, the HVU's waxy distillate became the HCU's feed. The operators called the HVU feed prep. |

| Central Control Room The central control room was commissioned in 1992. It was built to provide better control and communications between the process units. Most of the process units apart from the Sulphur recovery were controlled from here. The tank farm and waterfront were controlled from Road 6A Control Room. The boilerhouse had its own control room. The process plant in the background of the photo is the hydrocracker. |

| Flare System The flare system was designed to deal with any excess gas produced by the process units. The process units that produced gas exported that to either the high-pressure gas main run at 10 bar or the low-pressure gas main run at 4 bar. The process units could also export directly to the flare system. Relief valves set to protect linework or equipment also would open into the flare system should the pressure exceed the set pressure. There were two flare stacks, each with its own knock-out vessels. These were designed to remove any hydrocarbons from the gas. There was a compressor in the system downstream of the knock out vessels that sent any gas back to the refinery gas mains. Should the refinery furnaces be unable to deal with this gas, it would then be burnt via the stacks. When this happened, steam at a preset ratio would be injected with the gas to allow it to burn cleanly. The priority of these stacks were determined by a water level in the vessels that the gas passed through prior to entering the stacks. |

| Cooling Water Pumphouse; Abbreviated CWPH. The long, thin building is the cooling water pumphouse. Some of the process units used water from the Thames to cool the process streams through heat exchangers. The water passed through rotating screens prior to being pumped to the units. The pumps then fed the water into underground ducting, which had offtakes to each of the process units that used it. The more modern units had fin fan cooling. The CWPH also provided water to a firemain, which was a pipeline that ran around the refinery to be used in the event of a fire. This had dedicated pumps, separate from the cooling water system. |
