= Lazăr Edeleanu =

Romanian chemist (1861–1941)

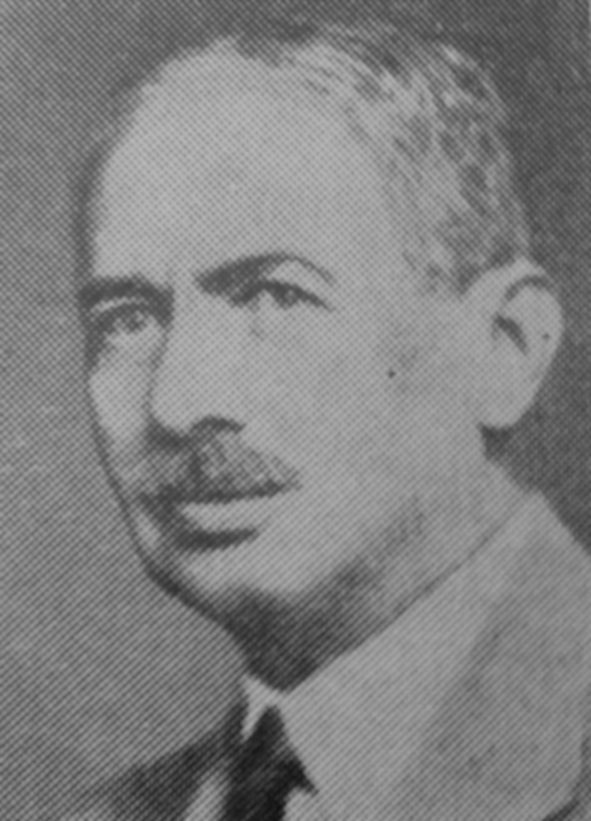
- Lazăr Edeleanu, Romanian chemist and inventor
- Born: 1 September 1861; Bucharest, United Principalities of Moldavia and Wallachia
- Died: 7 April 1941 (aged 79); Bucharest, Kingdom of Romania
- Education: University of Berlin
- Known for: Edeleanu process; Discovery of Amphetamine
- Awards: Member of the Society of Natural Sciences (1910); Honorary Member of the Institution of Petroleum Technologists (1925); Theophilus Redwood Medal (1932)
- Scientific career
- Fields: Chemistry
- Workplaces: Royal College of Artillery; Vega Refinery; Allgemeine Gesellschaft für Chemische Industrie
- Thesis: About some derivatives of phenyl methacrylic acid and phenyl isobutyric acid (1887)
- Doctoral advisor: August Wilhelm von Hofmann

Lazăr Edeleanu (Romanian: [ˈlazər edeˈle̯anu]; 1 September 1861, Bucharest – 7 April 1941, Bucharest) was a Romanian chemist of Jewish origin. He is known for being the first chemist to synthesize amphetamine at the University of Berlin and for inventing the modern method of refining crude oil.

== Research activity in England and Romania ==
After completing lyceum at Saint Sava High School, he went to study at the University of Berlin. He obtained his doctorate in Chemistry in 1887, with thesis "About some derivatives of phenyl methacrylic acid and phenyl isobutyric acid" written under the direction of August Wilhelm von Hofmann. After that, Edeleanu worked for some time at the Royal College of Artillery in London as a lecturer and as an assistant to Professor Hodgkinson. During this period, he collaborated with Charles Frederick Cross and Edward John Bevan to create a certain type of artificial fireproof silk. With Raphael Meldola he created oxazine-based dyes.

Back in Romania, he was hired by the chemist Constantin I. Istrati as an assistant and then as a lecturer at the University of Bucharest's Faculty of Sciences in the Organic Chemistry Department. In 1906 he was appointed Head of the Chemistry Laboratory at the Geology Institute, founded that year, and director of Vega Refinery near Ploiești, a refinery owned at that time by the German company Disconto-Gesellschaft. In 1907, along with Ion Tănăsescu, he co-organized the Petroleum Congress in Bucharest and co-authored a monograph on the physical and technical properties of Romanian crude oil.

His most significant invention, was the Edeleanu process (1908). It is a process in which petroleum is refined with liquid sulfur dioxide to selectively extract aromatic hydrocarbons (benzene, toluene, xylene, etc.). The procedure was first applied experimentally in Romania at the Vega Refinery and later spread to France (notably Rouen), Germany, and subsequently throughout the world.

== Research and business in Germany ==
In 1910, Edeleanu settled in Germany where he founded a company called "Allgemeine Gesellschaft für Chemische Industrie". Due to the success of the name "Edeleanu", the company changed its name to Edeleanu GmbH in 1930. One of the first refineries in UK was the Manchester Oil Refinery, which was built with the involvement of Edeleanu GmbH and opened in 1938 in Trafford Park. During the Nazi regime, it was bought by the Deutsche Erdöl-AG. Several ownership changes later it was acquired by Uhde GmbH in 2002, which is owned by the ThyssenKrupp trust. The name Edeleanu is still used for the refinery department until this day.

Edeleanu returned to Romania, where he died in Bucharest in April 1941.

== Heritage ==
By 1960, there were 80 Edeleanu facilities worldwide. The Edeleanu Method is still used today, in its many variations, and remains the basic process for manufacturing high quality oils.

Edeleanu obtained 212 patents for inventions in Romania, the United States, Germany, France, Austria, Sweden, and the Netherlands.

== Prizes and honors ==
- 1910 – Member of the Society of Natural Sciences in Moscow
- 1925 – Honorary Member of the Institution of Petroleum Technologists in London (1925)
- 1932 – Theophilus Redwood Medal for lifetime scientific achievement in analytic chemistry.

== Sources ==
- FCER - Contribuția evreilor din România la cultură și civilizație, Editura Hasefer, 2004 p. 215-216 (Federation of Jewish Communities in Romania - Contributions of Romanian Jews to culture and civilization, Hasefer Publishing House, Bucharest 2004, in Romanian 215–216)
- Allgemeine deutsche Biographie & Neue deutsche Biographie Bd.4, Duncker & Humblot, Berlin 1959
- Magdalene Moureau, Gerald Brace, Dictionnaire du petrole et d'autres sources d'energie –anglais- français Ed. Technip 2008
- E H J Rosenberg- The History of selective solvents, 1st World Petroleum Congress, 18–24 July 1933, London, UK
- Dr. L. Edeleanu – Ludovic Marzec, in the Monit. Petr. Roumanie, obituary article – 1941
