= Title 29 of the Code of Federal Regulations =

American regulation title

Title 29 (Labor) is one of fifty titles comprising the United States Code of Federal Regulations (CFR), containing the principal set of rules and regulations issued by federal agencies regarding labor. It is available in digital and printed form, and can be referenced online using the Electronic Code of Federal Regulations (eCFR).

== Structure ==
The table of contents, as reflected in the eCFR updated June 18, 2026, is as follows:

Volume	Chapter	Parts	Regulatory Entity
1		0-99	Subtitle A--Office of the Secretary of Labor
2	I	100-199	National Labor Relations Board
	II	200-299	Office of Labor-Management Standards, Department of Labor
	III	300-399	National Railroad Adjustment Board
	IV	400-499	Office of Labor-Management Standards, Department of Labor
3	V	500-899	Wage and Hour Division, Department of Labor
4	IX	900-999	Construction Industry Collective Bargaining Commission
	X	1200-1299	National Mediation Board
	XII	1400-1499	Federal Mediation and Conciliation Service
	XIV	1600-1899	Equal Employment Opportunity Commission
5	XVII	1900-1910 (1901.1-1910.999)	Occupational Safety and Health Administration, Department of Labor
6		1910 (1910.1000-end)	Occupational Safety and Health Administration, Department of Labor
7		1911-1925	Occupational Safety and Health Administration, Department of Labor
8		1926	Occupational Safety and Health Administration, Department of Labor
9		1927-1999	Occupational Safety and Health Administration, Department of Labor
	XX	2200-2499	Occupational Safety and Health Review Commission
	XXV	2500-2599	Employee Benefits Security Administration, Department of Labor
	XXVII	2700-2799	Federal Mine Safety and Health Review Commission
	XL	4000-4999	Pension Benefit Guaranty Corporation
