= Edeleanu process =

Oil refining process

The Edeleanu process is a type of extraction process in the petroleum refining industry, whereby liquid sulfur dioxide is used to extract aromatics from kerosene. Liquid SO_{2} selectively dissolves the aromatics leaving behind the low aromatic content kerosene as the finished product. It is named after the Romanian chemist Lazăr Edeleanu. The aromatic extract is then separated from SO_{2} through rectification and SO_{2} recirculation. Temperature is maintained at −20 °C (−4 °F).

By using a blend of sulfur dioxide and benzene, some improvement can be effected, more suitable solvents such as furfural, phenol and N-methyl-2-pyrrolidone are used.
