= Doctor sweetening process =

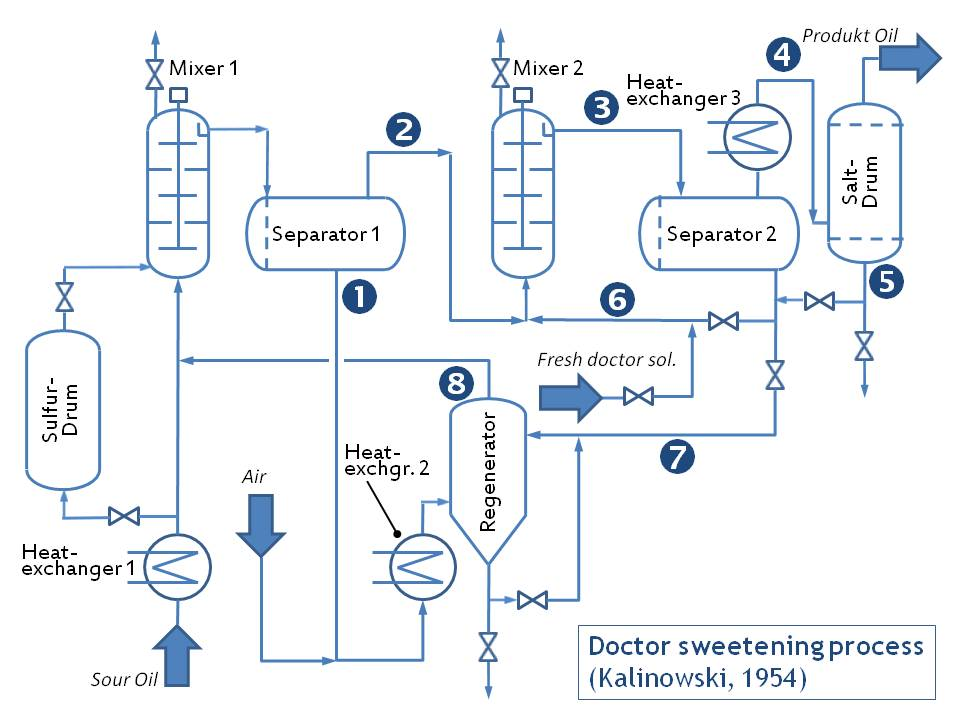
Doctor Sweetening Process; version as patented by Kalinowsky (1954)

The doctor sweetening process is an industrial chemical process for converting mercaptans in sour gasoline into disulfides. Sulfur compounds darken gasoline, give it an offensive odor and increase toxic sulfur dioxide engine emissions. However, this process only reduces the odor.

These sulfur compounds can be removed with the following chemical reactions:

$$\ce{\overset{sour~gasoline}{2RSH} + {Na2PbO2} + S ->[\text{in the presence of NaOH}] \overset{alkyl~disulfide}{R-S-S-R} + {PbS} + 2NaOH}$$

== Chemistry of the process ==
The chemistry of 'doctor sweetening' was described in detail by G. Wendt and S. Diggs in 1924. They also showed that the lead oxide solution brought about oxidation of the mercaptans to the corresponding organic disulfides, which are comparatively odourless. Lead oxide (litharge) dissolves in reasonably concentrated solutions of sodium hydroxide or potassium hydroxide owing to formation of a soluble compound, sodium plumbite:

$$\ce{PbO + 2NaOH -> Na2PbO2 + H2O}$$

When this alkaline solution is agitated with petroleum, the two liquids do not dissolve in one another, but any mercaptan in the oil will unite with an equivalent amount of the lead (which then passes into the petroleum) to form what is called a lead mercaptide, soluble in the oil:

$$\ce{2RSH + Na2PbO2 -> (RS)2Pb + 2NaOH}$$

If the mixture is now treated with powdered sulfur, which has a high affinity for lead, a black suspension of lead sulfide forms, and conversion of the mercaptide into a so-called disulfide (which remains in the oil) is induced:

$$\ce{-(RS)2Pb + S -> RS-SR + PbS}$$

With no sulfur added, but in the presence of atmospheric oxygen, the same conversion occurs, but only slowly, and probably not completely:

$$\ce{2(RS)2Pb + 4NaOH + O2 -> 2RS-SR + 2Na2PbO2 + 2H2O}$$

It is evident that the process does not remove the sulfur from the oil but even may increase the sulfur content if too much powdered sulfur is added, and some of the lead may remain in the petroleum.

The described chemistry is also the basis of the doctor test for the sweetness or sourness of gasoline (i.e., the extent of sulfur contamination). A gasoline is described as doctor sweet if, after shaking with sodium plumbite solutions, the addition of powdered sulfur fails to produce a dark precipitate of lead sulfide.

== Literature ==
- McBryde, W.A.E.: Petroleum deodorized: Early canadian history of the ‘doctor sweetening’ process, Annals of Science, Vol. 48, Issue 2, Taylor & Francis, 1991
- L. M. Henderson, W. B. Ross, C. M. Ridgway: Tetraethyllead Susceptibilities of Gasoline Doctor Treatment vs. Caustic Washing, Ind. Eng. Chem., 1939, 31 (1), p. 27–30
- Naphtali, Max: Fortschritte auf dem Gebiete der Mineralöle. Die technische Entwicklung der Erdölindustrie nach dem Kriege, Angewandte Chemie, Band 42, Ausgabe 20, p. 508-518, WILEY-VCH Verlag GmbH, May 18, 1929
- Otto Rotton, William Archer: Deodorizing Petroleum, American Artisan and Patent Record (New York), new series 5, p. 310, 1867
- G.L. Wendt, S.H. Diggs: The Chemistry of "Sweetening" in the Petroleum Industry, Industrial and Engineering Chemistry, Ausgabe 16, pp. 1113-1115, 1924
- M.L. Kalinowski: Doctor sweetening process using sulfur, US patent 2871187 January 27, 1957
