= Micro carbon residue =

Lab test for coking tendency of a substance

Micro carbon residue, commonly known as "MCR" is a laboratory test used to determine the amount of carbonaceous residue formed after evaporation and pyrolysis of petroleum materials under certain conditions. The test is used to provide some indication of a material's coke-forming tendencies. The test results are equivalent to the test results obtained from the Conradson Carbon Residue test.

== Test method ==
A quantity of sample is weighed, placed in a glass vial, and heated to 500 °C. Heating is performed in a controlled manner, for a specific period of time, and under an inert (nitrogen) atmosphere . The sample experiences coking reactions, with volatiles formed being swept away by the nitrogen. The carbonaceous residue remaining is reported as a mass percent of the original sample, and noted as “carbon residue (micro).”

=== Special considerations ===
- If the test result is expected to be below 0.10% (by mass), prior to performing the test, the sample can be distilled to produce a 10% (by volume) bottoms.
- If the sample contains ash-forming constituents and/or non-volatile additives, these will add to the carbon residue value, and be included as part of the total reported carbon residue value.
- In diesel fuel, the presence of alkyl nitrates, such as amyl nitrate, hexyl nitrate, or octyl nitrate, causes a higher carbon residue value as compared to untreated fuel. This may lead to erroneous conclusions as to the coke-forming tendencies of the fuel.

== Applications ==
Micro carbon residue offers the same range of applicability as the test to which it is equivalent, Conradson Carbon Residue. Advantages of MCR include better control of test conditions, smaller samples, and less operator attention. Applications include:

- For burner fuel, MCR provides an approximation of the tendency of the fuel to form deposits in vaporizing pot-type and sleeve-type burners.
- For diesel fuel, MCR correlates approximately with combustion chamber deposits, provided that alkyl nitrates are absent, or if present, that the test is performed on the base fuel without additive.
- For motor oil, MCR was once regarded as indicative of the amount of carbonaceous deposits the oil would form in the combustion chamber of an engine. This is now considered to be of doubtful significance due to the presence of additives in many oils.
- For gas oil, MCR provides a useful correlation in the manufacture of gas there from.
- For delayed cokers, the MCR of the feed correlates positively to the amount of coke that will be produced.
- For fluid catalytic cracking units, the MCR of the feed can be used to estimate the feed's coke-forming tendency.

== See also ==
- Conradson carbon residue
- Ramsbottom carbon residue
