= Conradson carbon residue =

Lab test for coking tendency of a substance

Conradson carbon residue, commonly known as "Concarbon" or "CCR", is a laboratory test used to provide an indication of the coke-forming tendencies of an oil. Quantitatively, the test measures the amount of carbonaceous residue remaining after the oil's evaporation and pyrolysis. In general, the test is applicable to petroleum products which are relatively non-volatile, and which decompose on distillation at atmospheric pressure. The phrase "Conradson carbon residue" and its common names can refer to either the test or the numerical value obtained from it.

== Test method ==
A quantity of sample is weighed, placed in a crucible, and subjected to destructive distillation. During a fixed period of severe heating, the residue undergoes cracking and coking reactions . At the termination of the heating period, the crucible containing the carbonaceous residue is cooled in a desiccator and weighed. The residue remaining is calculated as a percentage of the original sample, and reported as Conradson carbon residue.

== Applications ==
- For burner fuel, Concarbon provides an approximation of the tendency of the fuel to form deposits in vaporizing pot-type and sleeve-type burners.
- For diesel fuel, Concarbon correlates approximately with combustion chamber deposits, provided that alkyl nitrates are absent, or if present, that the test is performed on the base fuel without additive.
- For motor oil, Concarbon was once regarded as indicative of the amount of carbonaceous deposits the oil would form in the combustion chamber of an engine. This is now considered to be of doubtful significance due to the presence of additives in many oils.
- For gas oil, Concarbon provides a useful correlation in the manufacture of gas there from.
- For delayed cokers, the Concarbon of the feed correlates positively to the amount of coke that will be produced.
- For fluid catalytic cracking units, the Concarbon of the feed can be used to estimate the feed's coke-forming tendency.

== See also ==
- Ramsbottom Carbon Residue
