= Ramsbottom carbon residue =

Method to calculate the carbon residue of a fuel

Ramsbottom carbon residue (RCR) is well known in the petroleum industry as a method to calculate the carbon residue of a fuel. The carbon residue value is considered by some to give an approximate indication of the combustibility and deposit forming tendencies of the fuel.

== The carbon residue of a fuel ==
The Ramsbottom test is used to measure carbon residues of an oil. In brief, the carbon residue of a fuel is the tendency to form carbon deposits under high temperature conditions in an inert atmosphere. This is an important value for the crude oil refinery, and usually one of the measurements in a crude oil assay. Carbon residue is an important measurement for the feed to the refinery process fluid catalytic cracking and delayed coking.

== Calculation methods ==
There are three methods to calculate this carbon residue. It may be expressed as Ramsbottom carbon residue (RCR), Conradson carbon residue (CCR) or micro carbon residue (MCR). Numerically, the CCR value is the same as that of MCR. Sometimes the carbon residue value can be listed as residual carbon content, RCC, which is normally the same as MCR/CCR.

For the test, 4 grams of the sample are put into a weighed glass bulb. The sample in the bulb is heated in a bath at 553°C for 20 minutes. After cooling the bulb is weighed again and the difference noted.

== See also ==
- Conradson carbon residue
- Cracking (chemistry)
- Crude oil assay
- Micro carbon residue
- Oil refinery
- Petroleum
