= Martinez Refining Company =

American refinery company

Martinez Refinery
- Logo
- Location: Martinez, California

Refinery details
- Operator: MRC Energy
- Opened: c. 1915
- No. of employees: 585
- Refining units: 35
- Website: martinezrefiningcompany.com

The Martinez Refining Company is an American refinery company, which operates the Martinez Refinery. The refinery was built in 1915.

The Martinez Refinery is notable for the criticism due to excessive flare-ups and environmental issues.

== History ==
The refinery opened sometime in 1915, and was under Shell ownership since it was constructed, until it was sold to MRC Energy.

On February 1, 2025, a large fire broke out..

== Incidents, controversy ==
The Martinez Refinery has been criticized for excessive flare-ups, chemical releases, and other incidents for several years.

=== 2022 release incident ===
In a 2-day period from November 24-25 2022, The refinery released around 20 tons of waste material, which contained heavy metals.

The refinery failed to report this accidental release, which prevented the local siren system from being activated, however it was noted that refinery personnel was "unaware" of the release.

=== 2025 fire ===
At 10:45 am February 1, 2025, the Bay Area Air District received a notice of a foul odor coming from the refinery. Later, around 11:56, a second complaint was noted. More complaints continued throughout the afternoon. At exactly 1:49 pm, they received a tip that the refinery was on fire. The Contra Costa Community Warning System was activated, and the sirens part of this system was activated. It was reported that over 7,000 barrels of oil was released from the processing unit. The fire was not extinguished until February 4, 3 days later.

== See also ==
- Shell plc
- 2025 Martinez Refinery Fire
- Marathon Martinez Renewable Fuels
