= Gas pycnometer =

Type of laboratory device

A gas pycnometer is a laboratory device used for measuring the density—or, more accurately, the volume—of solids, be they regularly shaped, porous or non-porous, monolithic, powdered, granular or in some way comminuted, employing some method of gas displacement and the volume:pressure relationship known as Boyle's law. A gas pycnometer is also sometimes referred to as a helium pycnometer. The instrument invented by al-Bīrūnī, which functions on the principle of water volume displacement, is essentially the same as the modern pycnometer. The first known pictorial depiction of this device in the West can be traced to Wilhelm Homberg in 1699. Following the same method as al-Bīrūnī, Homberg noted that "the liquid is filled until it reaches just up to the tip of the small capillary tube." The pycnometer achieved its later accuracy through the work of Johann Heinrich Geißler (1815–1879).

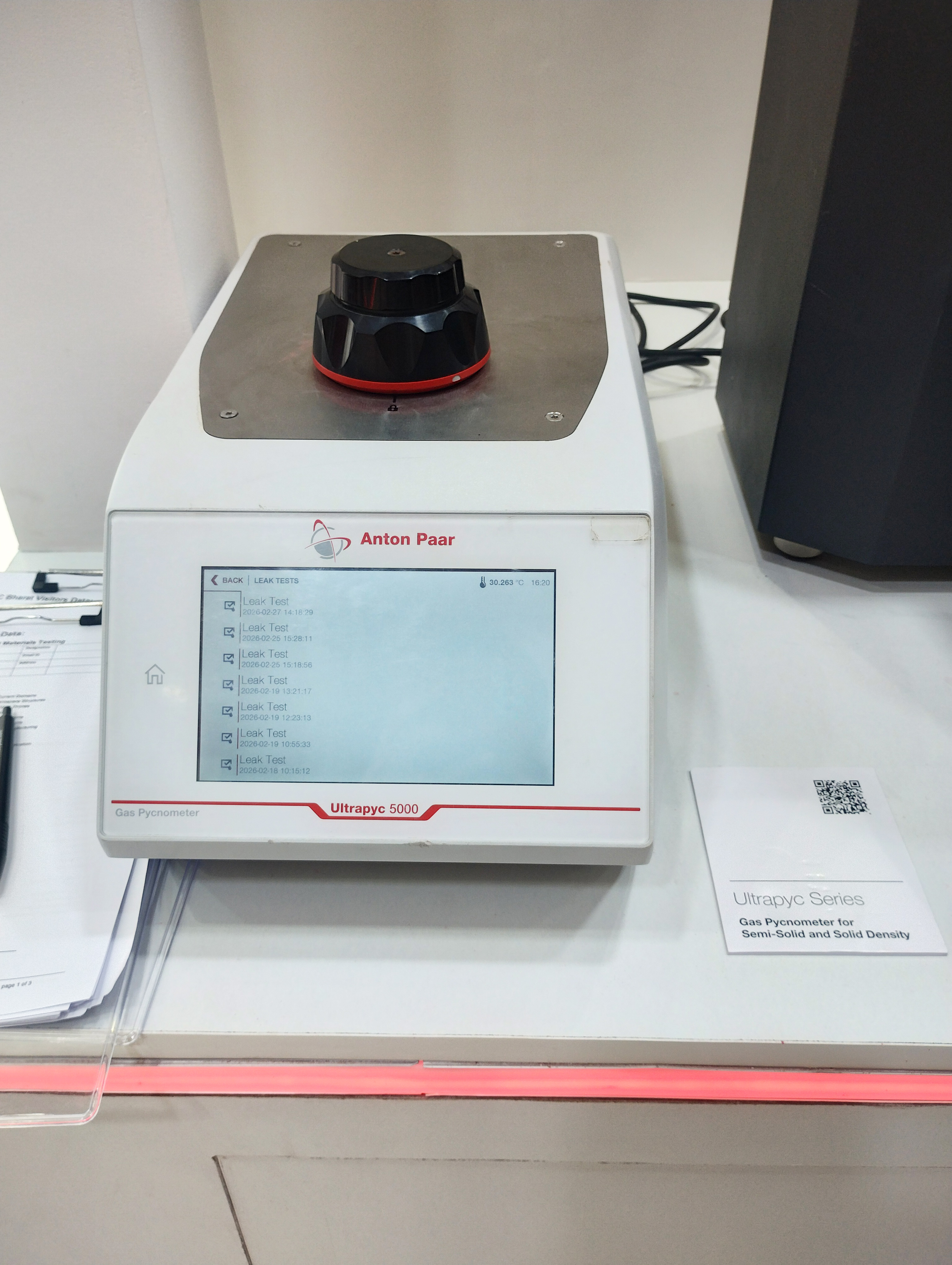
Anton Paar gas pycnometer for semi-solid and solid density, at DEF-TECH Bharat 2026, KTPO, Bengaluru

== Types of gas pycnometer ==
=== Gas expansion pycnometer ===
Gas expansion pycnometer is also known as constant volume gas pycnometer. The simplest type of gas pycnometer (due to its relative lack of moving parts) consists of two chambers, one (with a removable gas-tight lid) to hold the sample and a second chamber of fixed, known (via calibration) internal volume – referred to as the reference volume or added volume. The device additionally comprises a valve to admit a gas under pressure to one of the chambers, a pressure measuring device – usually a transducer – connected to the first chamber, a valved pathway connecting the two chambers, and a valved vent from the second of the chambers. In practice the sample may occupy either chamber, that is gas pycnometers can be constructed such that the sample chamber is pressurized first, or such that it is the reference chamber that starts at the higher pressure. Various design parameters have been analyzed by Tamari. The working equation of a gas pycnometer wherein the sample chamber is pressurized first is as follows:

$$V_{s} = V_{c} + \frac{ V_{r}} {1-\frac{P_{1}}{P_{2}}}$$

where V_{s} is the sample volume, V_{c} is the volume of the empty sample chamber (known from a prior calibration step), V_{r} is the volume of the reference volume (again known from a prior calibration step), P_{1} is the first pressure (i.e. in the sample chamber only) and P_{2} is the second (lower) pressure after expansion of the gas into the combined volumes of sample chamber and reference chamber.

Derivation of the "working equation" and a schematic illustration of such a gas expansion pycnometer is given by Lowell et al..

=== Variable volume pycnometer ===
Variable volume pycnometer (or gas comparison pycnometer) consists of either a single or two variable volume chambers. The sample cell volume can be at different types and size, like G-DenPyc 2900 technology specified, the volume can be 0.1ml up to 500ml. The volume of the chamber(s) can be varied by either a fixed amount by a simple mechanical piston of fixed travel, or continuously and gradually by means of a graduated piston. Resulting changes in pressure can be read by means of a transducer, or nullified by adjustment of a third ancillary, graduated variable-volume chamber. This type of pycnometer is commercially obsolete; in 2006 ASTM withdrew its standard test method D2856 for the open-cell content of rigid cellular plastics by the air pycnometer, which relied upon the use of a variable volume pycnometer, and was replaced by test method D6226 which describes a gas expansion pycnometer.

== Practical use ==
=== Volume vs density ===
While pycnometers (of any type) are recognized as density measuring devices they are in fact devices for measuring volume only. Density is merely calculated as the ratio of mass to volume; mass being invariably measured on a discrete device, usually by weighing. The volume measured in a gas pycnometer is that amount of three-dimensional space which is inaccessible to the gas used, i.e. that volume within the sample chamber from which the gas is excluded. Therefore, the volume measured considering the finest scale of surface roughness will depend on the atomic or molecular size of the gas. Helium therefore is most often prescribed as the measurement gas, not only is it of small size, it is also inert and the most ideal gas.

Closed pores, i.e. those that do not communicate with the surface of the solid, are included in the measured volume. Helium may however demonstrate some measurable permeability through low density solids (polymers and cellulosic materials predominantly) thus interfering with the measurement of solid volume. In such cases larger molecule gases such as nitrogen or sulfur hexafluoride are beneficial.

Adsorption of the measuring gas should be avoided, as should excessive vapor pressure from moisture or other liquids present in the otherwise solid sample.

=== Applications ===
Gas pycnometers are used extensively for characterizing a wide variety of solids such as heterogeneous catalysts, carbons, metal powders, soils, ceramics, active pharmaceutical ingredients (API's) and excipients, petroleum coke, cement and other construction materials, cenospheres/glass microballoons and solid foams.

== Notes ==
- Pycnometer is the preferred spelling in modern American English usage. Pyknometer is to be found in older texts, and is used interchangeably with pycnometer in British English. The term has its origins in the Greek word πυκνός, meaning "dense".
- The density calculated from a volume measured using a gas pycnometer is often referred to as skeletal density, true density or helium density.
- For non-porous solids a pycnometer can be used to measure particle density.
- An extreme example of the gas displacement principle for volume measurement is described in U.S. patent 5,231,873 (Lindberg, 1993) wherein a chamber large enough to hold a flatbed truck is used to measure the volume of a load of timber.

== See also ==
- Pycnometer
