= Particle density =

Particle density may refer to:

- Particle density (packed density), density of material that particles are composed of
- Particle density (particle count), average number of particles in unit volume or unit area

== See also ==
- Number density
