= Light oil =

Light oil may refer to:

- Light fuel oil produced through distillation.
- Light crude oil, which is less viscous than intermediate and heavy crude oil.
- Cycle oil, a light lubricating oil
