= 2025 Martinez Refinery fire =

On February 1, 2025, a large fire broke out at the Martinez Refinery in Martinez, California, US. The fire, which lasted several days, triggered the Community Warning System of Contra Costa County.

== Fire ==
=== Pre-fire ===
At 10:46, the Bay Area Air District received a complaint where a foul odor was observed near the refinery. This was the first of several complaints of "foul" odor as the complaints continued throughout the noon. Then, at exactly 1:49, the county was notified of the fire.

=== Fire ===
The refinery was evacuated immediately after it was reported, and emergency response crews responded immediately. The local siren system was activated and a shelter-in-place was issued.

The cause was determined due to waste material igniting. The fire lasted for several days, and was not extinguished until February 5.
