= Equilibrium catalyst =

Equilibrium catalyst usually refers to the catalyst mix use in fluid catalytic cracking (FCC), but includes other petrochemical processes that use large amounts (many tons) of catalysts. The catalyst is a zeolite. During the FCC, the catalyst "inventory" is regularly removed from operation and reactivated by combusting the accumulated coke, which is a catalyst poison. Some of the catalyst is irreversibly deactivated by metal contaminants and by degradation of the alumino silicate backbone of the zeolite. To compensate for these changes, some inventory is removed and some fresh catalyst is added. Thus, the inventory consists of a catalytic particles with a range of activities. This mixture is referred to as the equilibrium catalyst. In addition to FCC, equilibrium catalyst concept applies to hydroprocessing and hydrocracking.

== Spent catalyst disposal ==
The disposal of spent catalyst is gaining importance, particularly because of strict environmental regulations and high prices of fresh catalyst. Landfills and approved dumping sites have been predominantly used to get rid of the spent catalyst. Catalysts containing metals (nickel, vanadium, molybdenum) classified as hazardous are pre-treated before disposal. Sale of spent catalyst to the cement industry or its reuse in construction sites, metal casting industry, in road building offers immediate disposal solutions but with no economic benefits. Depending upon the quality of the spent catalyst, a specific property/attribute of the ECAT might be desirable in other processes. With some modifications in spent catalyst compositions, it could be reused in less severe processes.
