= Hydroprocessing =

Hydroprocessing is a catalytic term relating to the processes of hydrocracking and hydrotreating. These process are for the removal of sulfur, oxygen, nitrogen and metals from crude oil, this is done in the refining of fuel to enable lower sulfur levels in fuels.
