= Green coke =

Carbonization product

Green coke (raw coke) is the primary solid carbonization product from high boiling hydrocarbon fractions obtained at temperatures below 900 K. It contains a fraction of matter that can be released as volatiles during subsequent heat treatment at temperatures up to approximately 1600 K. This mass fraction, called volatile matter, is in the case of green coke between 4 and 15 wt.%, but it depends also on the heating rate.

Raw coke is an equivalent term to green coke although it is now less frequently used. The proportion of volatile matter of green coke depends on temperature and time of cooking, but also on the method for its determination.

== See also ==
- Coke (fuel)
- Coker unit
- Delayed coker
- Petroleum coke
