= Cycle oil =

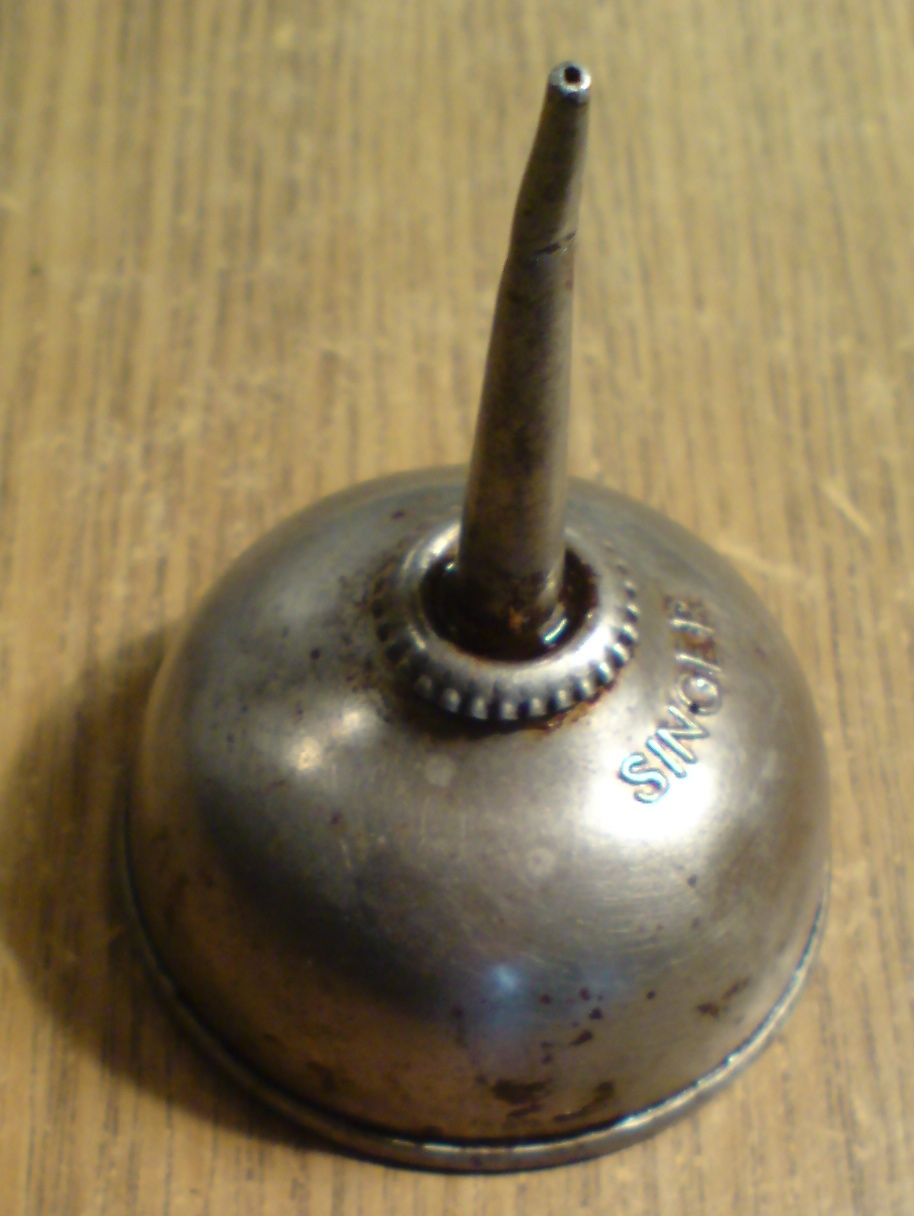
Small oil application device for Singer sewing machines

Cycle oil is a light lubricating oil suited for use on bicycles and similar devices. It is a liquid residue produced in the petroleum industry when catalytic cracking is employed to convert heavy hydrocarbon fractions remaining from earlier stages of crude oil refining into more valuable lighter products.

Catalytic cracking produces petrol (gasoline), liquid petroleum gas (LPG), unsaturated olefin compounds, cracked gas oils, cycle oil, light gases and a solid coke residue. Cycle oil may be processed further to break it down into more useful products; in particular it may be mixed with heavier products and put through the refining process again (recycled).
