= Coker unit =

Oil refinery processing unit

A coker or coker unit is an oil refinery processing unit that converts the residual oil from the vacuum distillation column into low molecular weight hydrocarbon gases, naphtha, light and heavy gas oils, and petroleum coke. The process thermally cracks the long chain hydrocarbon molecules in the residual oil feed into shorter chain molecules leaving behind the excess carbon in the form of petroleum coke.

This petroleum coke can either be fuel grade (high in sulphur and metals) or anode grade (low in sulphur and metals). The raw coke from the coker is often referred to as green coke. In this context, "green" means unprocessed. The further processing of green coke by calcining in a rotary kiln removes residual volatile hydrocarbons from the coke. The calcined petroleum coke can be further processed in an anode baking oven in order to produce anode coke of the desired shape and physical properties. The anodes are mainly used in the aluminium and steel industry.

== Types ==
There are three types of cokers used in oil refineries: delayed coker, fluid coker and flexicoker. The one that is by far the most commonly used is the delayed coker.

The schematic flow diagram below depicts a typical delayed coker:

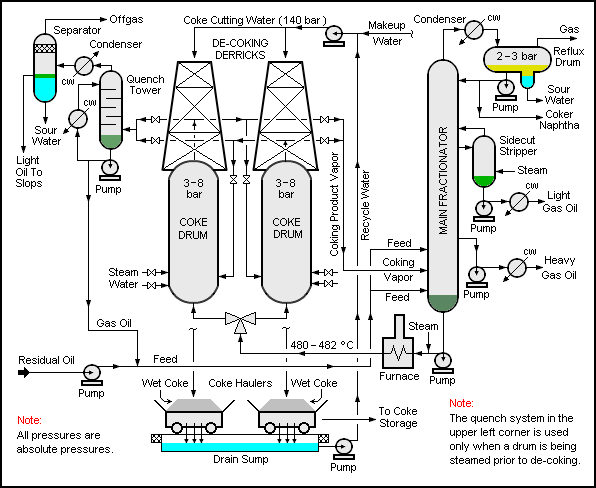
A typical schematic flow diagram of a delayed coking unit

== See also ==
- Delayed coker
- Shukhov cracking process
- Burton process
- Petroleum coke
