= Relative density =

Ratio of two densities

Specific gravity
- Common symbols: $\mathrm{RD}$, $\mathrm{SG}$
- SI unit: Unitless
- Derivations from other quantities: $\mathrm{RD} = \frac {\rho_\mathrm{sample}}{\rho_\mathrm{H_2O}}$

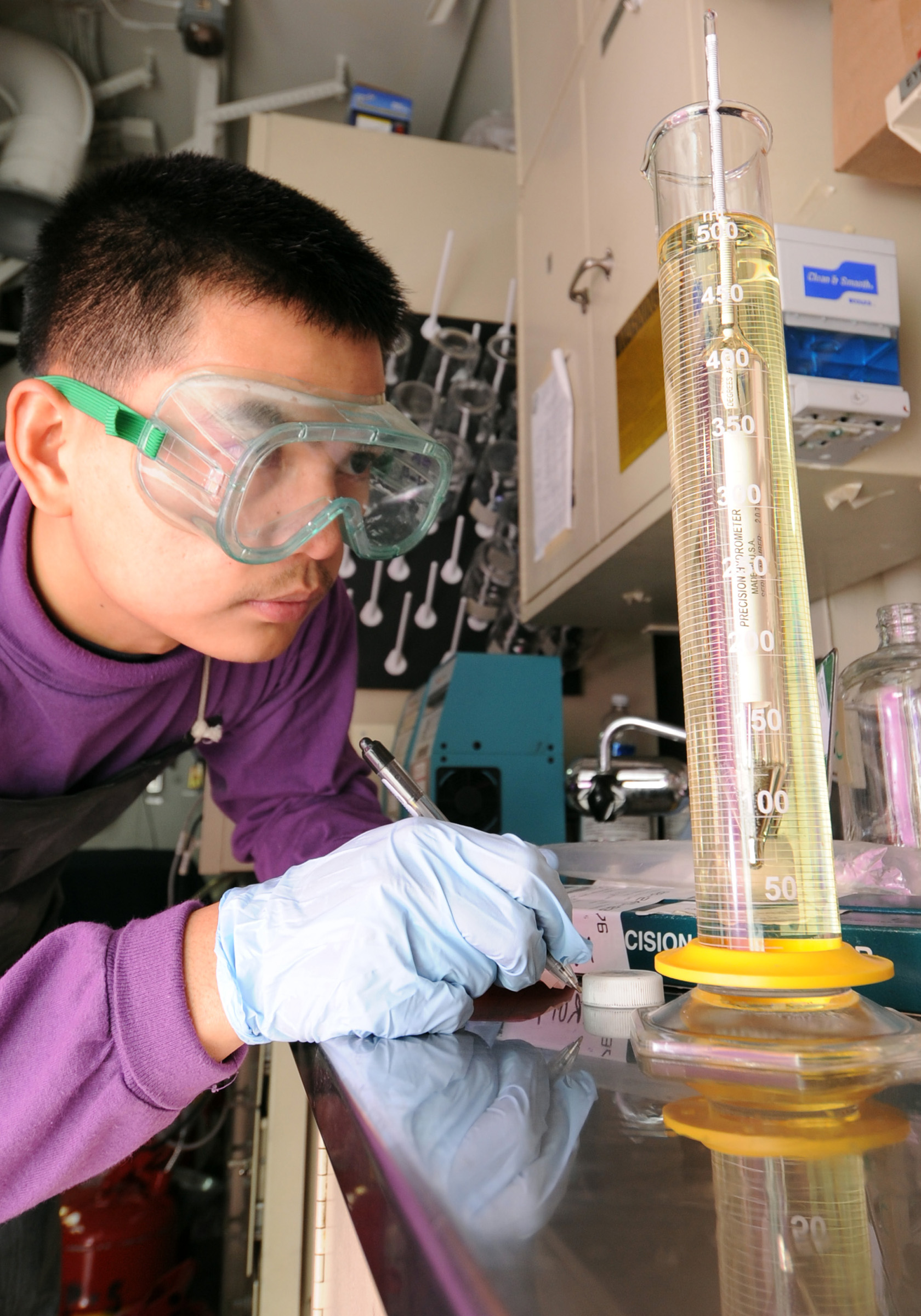
A United States Navy Aviation boatswain's mate tests the relative density of JP-5 fuel

Relative density, also called specific gravity, is a dimensionless quantity defined as the ratio of the density (mass divided by volume) of a substance to the density of a given reference material. The relative density of solids and liquids is nearly always measured with respect to water at its densest (at 4 °C or 39.2 °F); for gases, the reference is air at room temperature (25 °C or 77.0 °F). The term "relative density" (abbreviated r.d. or RD) is preferred modern use, for example in ISO, IUPAC, and NIST, while the term "specific gravity" (abbreviated S.G. or SG) is gradually being abandoned.

If a substance's relative density is less than 1 then it is less dense than the reference; if greater than 1 then it is denser than the reference. If the relative density is exactly 1 then the densities are equal; that is, equal volumes of the two substances have the same mass. If the reference material is water, then a substance with a relative density less than 1 will float in water. For example, an ice cube, with a relative density of about 0.91, will float. A substance with a relative density greater than 1 will sink.

Temperature and pressure must be specified for both the sample and the reference. The pressure is nearly always atmospheric pressure (1 atm or 101.325 kPa), and where it is not, usually the density is specified directly. The reference temperature for water is often 4 °C (39.2 °F), but 15 °C (59.0 °F) and 20 °C (68.0 °F) are also common standards, depending on the industry (like brewing or petroleum). In British brewing practice, the relative density, as specified above, is multiplied by 1000. Relative density is commonly used in industry as a simple means of obtaining information about the concentration of solutions of various materials such as brines, must weight (syrups, juices, honeys, brewers wort, must, etc.) and acids.

== Basic calculation ==
Relative density ($\mathrm{RD}$) or specific gravity ($\mathrm{SG}$) is a dimensionless quantity, as it is the ratio of either densities or weights
$$\mathrm{RD} = \frac{\rho_\mathrm{substance}}{\rho_\mathrm{reference}},$$
where $\mathrm{RD}$ is relative density, $\rho_\mathrm{substance}$ is the density of the substance being measured, and $\rho_\mathrm{reference}$ is the density of the reference. (By convention $\rho$, the Greek letter rho, denotes density.)

The reference material can be indicated using subscripts: $\mathrm{RD}_\mathrm{substance/reference}$ which means "the relative density of substance with respect to reference". If the reference is not explicitly stated then it is normally assumed to be water at 4 °C (or, more precisely, 3.98 °C, which is the temperature at which water reaches its maximum density). In SI units, the density of water is (approximately) 1000 kg/m^{3} or 1 g/cm^{3}, which makes relative density calculations particularly convenient: the density of the object only needs to be divided by 1000 or 1, depending on the units.

The relative density of gases is often measured with respect to dry air at a temperature of 20 °C and a pressure of 101.325 kPa absolute, which has a density of 1.205 kg/m^{3}. Relative density with respect to air can be obtained by
$$\mathit{RD} = \frac{\rho_\mathrm{gas}}{\rho_\mathrm{air}} \approx \frac{M_\mathrm{gas}}{M_\mathrm{air}},$$
where $M$ is the molar mass and the approximately equal sign is used because equality pertains only if 1 mol of the gas and 1 mol of air occupy the same volume at a given temperature and pressure, i.e., they are both ideal gases. Ideal behaviour is usually only seen at very low pressure. For example, one mol of an ideal gas occupies 22.414 L at 0 °C and 1 atmosphere whereas carbon dioxide has a molar volume of 22.259 L under those same conditions.

Those with SG greater than 1 are denser than water and will, disregarding surface tension effects, sink in it. Those with an SG less than 1 are less dense than water and will float on it. In scientific work, the relationship of mass to volume is usually expressed directly in terms of the density (mass per unit volume) of the substance under study. It is in industry where relative density finds wide application, often for historical reasons.

True relative density of a liquid can be expressed mathematically as:
$$\mathrm{RD}_\mathrm{true} = \frac {\rho_\mathrm{sample}}{\rho_\mathrm{H_2O}},$$
where $\rho_\mathrm{sample}$ is the density of the sample and $\rho_\mathrm{H_2O}$ is the density of water.

The apparent relative density is simply the ratio of the weights of equal volumes of sample and water in air:
$$\mathrm{RD}_\mathrm{apparent} = \frac {W_{\mathrm{A},\text{sample}}}{W_{\mathrm{A},\mathrm{H_2O}}},$$
where $W_{A,\text{sample}}$ represents the weight of the sample measured in air and ${W_{\mathrm{A},\mathrm{H_2O}}}$ the weight of an equal volume of water measured in air.

It can be shown that true relative density can be computed from different properties:
$$\mathrm{RD}_\mathrm{true} = \frac {\rho_\mathrm{sample}}{\rho_\mathrm{H_2O}} = \frac {\frac{m_\mathrm{sample}}{V}}{\frac{m_\mathrm{H_2O}}{V}} = \frac {m_\mathrm{sample}}{m_\mathrm{H_2O}} \frac{g}{g} = \frac {W_{\mathrm{V},\text{sample}}}{W_{\mathrm{V},\mathrm{H_2O}}},$$

where g is the local acceleration due to gravity, V is the volume of the sample and of water (the same for both), ρ_{sample} is the density of the sample, ρ_{H_{2}O} is the density of water, W_{V} represents a weight obtained in vacuum, $m_\mathrm{sample}$ is the mass of the sample and $m_\mathrm{H_2 O}$ is the mass of an equal volume of water.

The density of water and of the sample varies with temperature and pressure, so it is necessary to specify the temperatures and pressures at which the densities or weights were determined. Measurements are nearly always made at 1 nominal atmosphere (101.325 kPa ± variations from changing weather patterns), but as relative density usually refers to highly incompressible aqueous solutions or other incompressible substances (such as petroleum products), variations in density caused by pressure are usually neglected at least where apparent relative density is being measured. For true (in vacuo) relative density calculations, air pressure must be considered (see below). Temperatures are specified by the notation (T_{s}/T_{r}), with T_{s} representing the temperature at which the sample's density was determined and T_{r} the temperature at which the reference (water) density is specified. For example, SG (20 °C/4 °C) would be understood to mean that the density of the sample was determined at 20 °C and of the water at 4 °C. Taking into account different sample and reference temperatures, while SG_{H_{2}O} = 1.000000 (20 °C/20 °C), it is also the case that SG_{H_{2}O} = 0.9982008/0.9999720 = 0.9982288 (20 °C/4 °C). Here, temperature is being specified using the current ITS-90 scale and the densities used here and in the rest of this article are based on that scale. On the previous IPTS-68 scale, the densities at 20 °C and 4 °C are 0.9982041 and 0.9999720 respectively, resulting in an SG (20 °C/4 °C) value for water of 0.998232.

As the principal use of relative density measurements in industry is determination of the concentrations of substances in aqueous solutions and as these are found in tables of SG versus concentration, it is extremely important that the analyst enter the table with the correct form of relative density. For example, in the brewing industry, the Plato table lists sucrose concentration by weight against true SG, and was originally (20 °C/4 °C) i.e. based on measurements of the density of sucrose solutions made at laboratory temperature (20 °C) but referenced to the density of water at 4 °C which is very close to the temperature at which water has its maximum density, ρ_{H_{2}O} equal to 999.972 kg/m^{3} in SI units (0.999972 g/cm^{3} in cgs units or 62.43 lb/cu ft in United States customary units). The ASBC table in use today in North America for apparent relative density measurements at (20 °C/20 °C) is derived from the original Plato table using Plato et al.'s value for SG(20 °C/4 °C) = 0.9982343. In the sugar, soft drink, honey, fruit juice and related industries, sucrose concentration by weight is taken from a table prepared by A. Brix, which uses SG (17.5 °C/17.5 °C). As a final example, the British SG units are based on reference and sample temperatures of 60 °F and are thus (15.56 °C/15.56 °C).

Given the relative density of a substance, its actual density can be calculated by rearranging the above formula:
$$\rho_\mathrm{substance} = SG \times \rho_\mathrm{H_2O}.$$

== Temperature dependence ==
See Density for a table of the measured densities of water at various temperatures.

The density of substances varies with temperature and pressure so that it is necessary to specify the temperatures and pressures at which the densities or masses were determined. It is nearly always the case that measurements are made at nominally 1 atmosphere (101.325 kPa ignoring the variations caused by changing weather patterns) but as relative density usually refers to highly incompressible aqueous solutions or other incompressible substances (such as petroleum products) variations in density caused by pressure are usually neglected at least where apparent relative density is being measured. For true (in vacuo) relative density calculations air pressure must be considered (see below). Temperatures are specified by the notation (T_{s}/T_{r}) with T_{s} representing the temperature at which the sample's density was determined and T_{r} the temperature at which the reference (water) density is specified. For example, SG (20 °C/4 °C) would be understood to mean that the density of the sample was determined at 20 °C and of the water at 4 °C. Taking into account different sample and reference temperatures, while SG_{H_{2}O} = 1.000000 (20 °C/20 °C) it is also the case that RD_{H_{2}O} = 0.9982008/0.9999720 = 0.9982288 (20 °C/4 °C). Here temperature is being specified using the current ITS-90 scale and the densities used here and in the rest of this article are based on that scale. On the previous IPTS-68 scale the densities at 20 °C and 4 °C are, respectively, 0.9982041 and 0.9999720 resulting in an RD (20 °C/4 °C) value for water of 0.99823205.

The temperatures of the two materials may be explicitly stated in the density symbols; for example:

relative density: 8.15^{20 °C}_{4 °C}

where the superscript indicates the temperature at which the density of the material is measured, and the subscript indicates the temperature of the reference substance to which it is compared.

== Uses ==
Relative density can also help to quantify the buoyancy of a substance in a fluid or gas, or determine the density of an unknown substance from the known density of another. Relative density is often used by geologists and mineralogists to help determine the mineral content of a rock or other sample. Gemologists use it as an aid in the identification of gemstones. Water is preferred as the reference because measurements are then easy to carry out in the field (see below for examples of measurement methods).

As the principal use of relative density measurements in industry is determination of the concentrations of substances in aqueous solutions and these are found in tables of RD vs concentration it is extremely important that the analyst enter the table with the correct form of relative density. For example, in the brewing industry, the Plato table, which lists sucrose concentration by mass against true RD, were originally (20 °C/4 °C) that is based on measurements of the density of sucrose solutions made at laboratory temperature (20 °C) but referenced to the density of water at 4 °C which is very close to the temperature at which water has its maximum density of ρ(H_{2}O) equal to 0.999972 g/cm^{3} (or 62.43 lb·ft^{−3}). The ASBC table in use today in North America, while it is derived from the original Plato table is for apparent relative density measurements at (20 °C/20 °C) on the IPTS-68 scale where the density of water is 0.9982071 g/cm^{3}. In the sugar, soft drink, honey, fruit juice and related industries sucrose concentration by mass is taken from this work which uses SG (17.5 °C/17.5 °C). As a final example, the British RD units are based on reference and sample temperatures of 60 °F and are thus (15.56 °C/15.56 °C).

In medicine, relative density is particularly used in the pharmaceutical field. It is used in automated compounders in preparation of multicomponent mixtures for parenteral nutrition, while it is an important factor in urinalysis, relative density is an indicator of both the concentration of particles in the urine and a patient's degree of hydration.

== Measurement ==
Relative density can be calculated directly by measuring the density of a sample and dividing it by the (known) density of the reference substance. The density of the sample is simply its mass divided by its volume. Although mass is easy to measure, the volume of an irregularly shaped sample can be more difficult to ascertain. One method is to put the sample in a water-filled graduated cylinder and read off how much water it displaces. Alternatively the container can be filled to the brim, the sample immersed, and the volume of overflow measured. The surface tension of the water may keep a significant amount of water from overflowing, which is especially problematic for small samples. For this reason it is desirable to use a water container with as small a mouth as possible.

For each substance, the density, ρ, is given by
$$\rho = \frac{\text{Mass}}{\text{Volume}}
= \frac{\text{Deflection} \times \frac{\text{Spring Constant}}{\text{Gravity}}}{\text{Displacement}_\mathrm{Water Line} \times \text{Area}_\mathrm{Cylinder}}.$$

When these densities are divided, references to the spring constant, gravity and cross-sectional area simply cancel, leaving
$$RD = \frac{\rho_\mathrm{object}}{\rho_\mathrm{ref}}
= \frac{\frac{\text{Deflection}_\mathrm{Obj.}}{\text{Displacement}_\mathrm{Obj.}}}{\frac{\text{Deflection}_\mathrm{Ref.}}{\text{Displacement}_\mathrm{Ref.}}}
= \frac{\frac{3\ \mathrm{in}}{20\ \mathrm{mm}}}{\frac{5\ \mathrm{in}}{34\ \mathrm{mm}}}=\frac{3\ \mathrm{in} \times 34\ \mathrm{mm}}{5\ \mathrm{in} \times 20\ \mathrm{mm}} = 1.02.$$

=== Hydrostatic weighing ===
Relative density is more easily and perhaps more accurately measured without measuring volume. Using a spring scale, the sample is weighed first in air and then in water. Relative density (with respect to water) can then be calculated using the following formula:
$$RD = \frac{W_\mathrm{air}}{W_\mathrm{air} - W_\mathrm{water}},$$
where

- W_{air} is the weight of the sample in air (measured in newtons, pounds-force or some other unit of force)
- W_{water} is the weight of the sample in water (measured in the same units).

This technique cannot easily be used to measure relative densities less than one, because the sample will then float. W_{water} becomes a negative quantity, representing the force needed to keep the sample underwater.

Another practical method uses three measurements. The sample is weighed dry. Then a container filled to the brim with water is weighed, and weighed again with the sample immersed, after the displaced water has overflowed and been removed. Subtracting the last reading from the sum of the first two readings gives the weight of the displaced water. The relative density result is the dry sample weight divided by that of the displaced water. This method allows the use of scales which cannot handle a suspended sample. A sample less dense than water can also be handled, but it has to be held down, and the error introduced by the fixing material must be considered.

=== Hydrometer ===

The relative density of a liquid can be measured using a hydrometer. This consists of a bulb attached to a stalk of constant cross-sectional area, as shown in the adjacent diagram.

First the hydrometer is floated in the reference liquid (shown in light blue), and the displacement (the level of the liquid on the stalk) is marked (blue line). The reference could be any liquid, but in practice it is usually water.

The hydrometer is then floated in a liquid of unknown density (shown in green). The change in displacement, Δx, is noted. In the example depicted, the hydrometer has dropped slightly in the green liquid; hence its density is lower than that of the reference liquid. It is necessary that the hydrometer floats in both liquids.

The application of simple physical principles allows the relative density of the unknown liquid to be calculated from the change in displacement. (In practice the stalk of the hydrometer is pre-marked with graduations to facilitate this measurement.)

In the explanation that follows,

- ρ_{ref} is the known density (mass per unit volume) of the reference liquid (typically water).
- ρ_{new} is the unknown density of the new (green) liquid.
- RD_{new/ref} is the relative density of the new liquid with respect to the reference.
- V is the volume of reference liquid displaced, i.e. the red volume in the diagram.
- m is the mass of the entire hydrometer.
- g is the local gravitational constant.
- Δx is the change in displacement. In accordance with the way in which hydrometers are usually graduated, Δx is here taken to be negative if the displacement line rises on the stalk of the hydrometer, and positive if it falls. In the example depicted, Δx is negative.
- A is the cross sectional area of the shaft.

Since the floating hydrometer is in static equilibrium, the downward gravitational force acting upon it must exactly balance the upward buoyancy force. The gravitational force acting on the hydrometer is simply its weight, mg. From the Archimedes buoyancy principle, the buoyancy force acting on the hydrometer is equal to the weight of liquid displaced. This weight is equal to the mass of liquid displaced multiplied by g, which in the case of the reference liquid is ρ_{ref}Vg. Setting these equal, we have
$$mg = \rho_\mathrm{ref}Vg$$

or just

$$m = \rho_\mathrm{ref} V.$$	1

Exactly the same equation applies when the hydrometer is floating in the liquid being measured, except that the new volume is V − AΔx (see note above about the sign of Δx). Thus,

$$m = \rho_\mathrm{new} (V - A \Delta x).$$	2

Combining (1) and (2) yields

$$RD_\mathrm{new/ref} = \frac{\rho_\mathrm{new}}{\rho_\mathrm{ref}} = \frac{V}{V - A \Delta x}.$$	3

But from (1) we have V = m/ρ_{ref}. Substituting into (3) gives

$$RD_\mathrm{new/ref} = \frac{1}{1 - \frac{A \Delta x}{m} \rho_\mathrm{ref}}.$$	4

This equation allows the relative density to be calculated from the change in displacement, the known density of the reference liquid, and the known properties of the hydrometer. If Δx is small then, as a first-order approximation of the geometric series equation (4) can be written as:
$$RD_\mathrm{new/ref} \approx 1 + \frac{A \Delta x}{m} \rho_\mathrm{ref}.$$

This shows that, for small Δx, changes in displacement are approximately proportional to changes in relative density.

=== Pycnometer ===
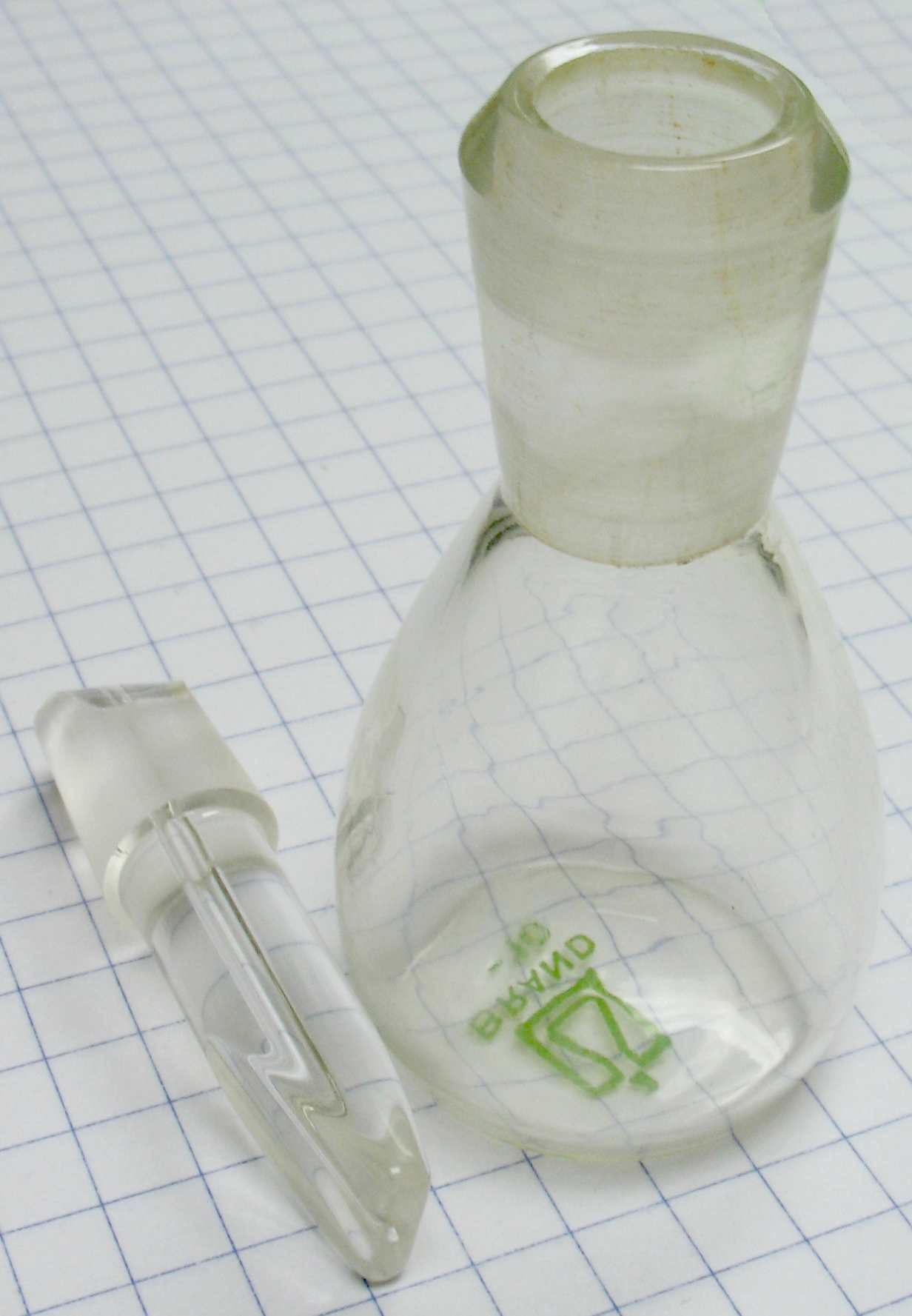
An empty glass pycnometer and stopper

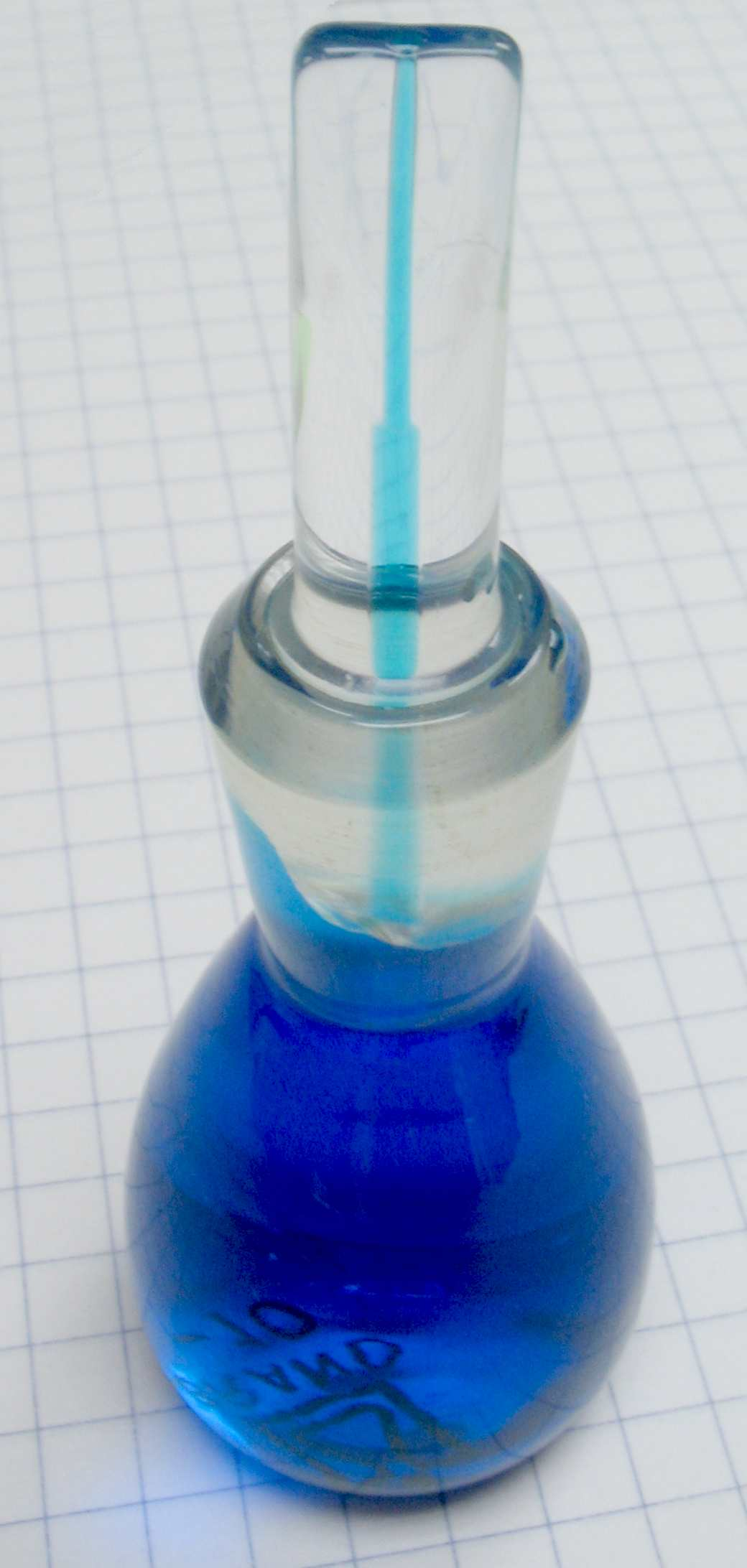
A filled pycnometer

A pycnometer (from Ancient Greek: πυκνός, romanized: puknos, lit. 'dense'), also called pyknometer or specific gravity bottle, is a device used to determine the density of a liquid. A pycnometer is usually made of glass, with a close-fitting ground glass stopper with a capillary tube through it, so that air bubbles may escape from the apparatus. This device enables a liquid's density to be measured accurately by reference to an appropriate working fluid, such as water or mercury, using an analytical balance.

If the flask is weighed empty, full of water, and full of a liquid whose relative density is desired, the relative density of the liquid can easily be calculated. The particle density of a powder, to which the usual method of weighing cannot be applied, can also be determined with a pycnometer. The powder is added to the pycnometer, which is then weighed, giving the weight of the powder sample. The pycnometer is then filled with a liquid of known density, in which the powder is completely insoluble. The weight of the displaced liquid can then be determined, and hence the relative density of the powder.

A gas pycnometer, the gas-based manifestation of a pycnometer, compares the change in pressure caused by a measured change in a closed volume containing a reference (usually a steel sphere of known volume) with the change in pressure caused by the sample under the same conditions. The difference in change of pressure represents the volume of the sample as compared to the reference sphere, and is usually used for solid particulates that may dissolve in the liquid medium of the pycnometer design described above, or for porous materials into which the liquid would not fully penetrate.

When a pycnometer is filled to a specific, but not necessarily accurately known volume, V and is placed upon a balance, it will exert a force
$$F_\mathrm{b} = g\left(m_\mathrm{b} - \rho_\mathrm{a}\frac{m_\mathrm{b}}{\rho_\mathrm{b}}\right),$$
where m_{b} is the mass of the bottle and g the gravitational acceleration at the location at which the measurements are being made. ρ_{a} is the density of the air at the ambient pressure and ρ_{b} is the density of the material of which the bottle is made (usually glass) so that the second term is the mass of air displaced by the glass of the bottle whose weight, by Archimedes Principle must be subtracted. The bottle is filled with air but as that air displaces an equal amount of air the weight of that air is canceled by the weight of the air displaced. Now we fill the bottle with the reference fluid e.g. pure water. The force exerted on the pan of the balance becomes:
$$F_\mathrm{w} = g\left(m_\mathrm{b} - \rho_\mathrm{a} \frac{m_\mathrm{b}}{\rho_\mathrm{b}} + V\rho_\mathrm{w} - V\rho_\mathrm{a}\right).$$

If we subtract the force measured on the empty bottle from this (or tare the balance before making the water measurement) we obtain.
$$F_\mathrm{w,n} = gV( \rho_\mathrm{w} - \rho_\mathrm{a}),$$
where the subscript n indicated that this force is net of the force of the empty bottle. The bottle is now emptied, thoroughly dried and refilled with the sample. The force, net of the empty bottle, is now:
$$F_\mathrm{s,n} = gV(\rho_\mathrm{s} - \rho_\mathrm{a}),$$
where ρ_{s} is the density of the sample. The ratio of the sample and water forces is:
$$SG_\mathrm{A} = \frac{gV(\rho_\mathrm{s} - \rho_\mathrm{a})}{gV( \rho_\mathrm{w} - \rho_\mathrm{a})} = \frac{\rho_\mathrm{s} - \rho_\mathrm{a}}{\rho_\mathrm{w} - \rho_\mathrm{a}}.$$

This is called the apparent relative density, denoted by subscript A, because it is what we would obtain if we took the ratio of net weighings in air from an analytical balance or used a hydrometer (the stem displaces air). Note that the result does not depend on the calibration of the balance. The only requirement on it is that it read linearly with force. Nor does RD_{A} depend on the actual volume of the pycnometer.

Further manipulation and finally substitution of RD_{V}, the true relative density (the subscript V is used because this is often referred to as the relative density in vacuo), for ρ_{s}/ρ_{w} gives the relationship between apparent and true relative density:

$$RD_\mathrm{A}= {{\rho_\mathrm{s} \over \rho_\mathrm{w}}-{\rho_\mathrm{a} \over \rho_\mathrm{w}} \over 1 - {\rho_\mathrm{a} \over \rho_\mathrm{w}}} ={RD_\mathrm{V}-{\rho_\mathrm{a} \over \rho_\mathrm{w}} \over 1 - {\rho_\mathrm{a} \over \rho_\mathrm{w}}}.$$

In the usual case we will have measured weights and want the true relative density. This is found from
$$RD_\mathrm{V} = RD_\mathrm{A} - {\rho_\mathrm{a} \over \rho_\mathrm{w} }(RD_\mathrm{A}-1).$$

Since the density of dry air at 101.325 kPa at 20 °C is 0.001205 g/cm^{3} and that of water is 0.998203 g/cm^{3} we see that the difference between true and apparent relative densities for a substance with relative density (20 °C/20 °C) of about 1.100 would be 0.000120. Where the relative density of the sample is close to that of water (for example dilute ethanol solutions) the correction is even smaller.

The pycnometer is used in ISO standard: ISO 1183-1:2004, ISO 1014–1985 and ASTM standard: ASTM D854.

Types

- Gay-Lussac, pear shaped, with perforated stopper, adjusted, capacity 1, 2, 5, 10, 25, 50 and 100 mL
- as above, with ground-in thermometer, adjusted, side tube with cap
- Hubbard, for bitumen and heavy crude oils, cylindrical type, ASTM D 70, 24 mL
- as above, conical type, ASTM D 115 and D 234, 25 mL
- Boot, with vacuum jacket and thermometer, capacity 5, 10, 25 and 50 mL

=== Digital density meters ===
Hydrostatic Pressure-based Instruments: This technology relies upon Pascal's Principle which states that the pressure difference between two points within a vertical column of fluid is dependent upon the vertical distance between the two points, the density of the fluid and the gravitational force. This technology is often used for tank gauging applications as a convenient means of liquid level and density measure.

Vibrating Element Transducers: This type of instrument requires a vibrating element to be placed in contact with the fluid of interest. The resonant frequency of the element is measured and is related to the density of the fluid by a characterization that is dependent upon the design of the element. In modern laboratories precise measurements of relative density are made using oscillating U-tube meters. These are capable of measurement to 5 to 6 places beyond the decimal point and are used in the brewing, distilling, pharmaceutical, petroleum and other industries. The instruments measure the actual mass of fluid contained in a fixed volume at temperatures between 0 and 80 °C but as they are microprocessor based can calculate apparent or true relative density and contain tables relating these to the strengths of common acids, sugar solutions, etc.

Ultrasonic Transducer: Ultrasonic waves are passed from a source, through the fluid of interest, and into a detector which measures the acoustic spectroscopy of the waves. Fluid properties such as density and viscosity can be inferred from the spectrum.

Radiation-based Gauge: Radiation is passed from a source, through the fluid of interest, and into a scintillation detector, or counter. As the fluid density increases, the detected radiation "counts" will decrease. The source is typically the radioactive isotope caesium-137, with a half-life of about 30 years. A key advantage for this technology is that the instrument is not required to be in contact with the fluid—typically the source and detector are mounted on the outside of tanks or piping.

Buoyant Force Transducer: the buoyancy force produced by a float in a homogeneous liquid is equal to the weight of the liquid that is displaced by the float. Since buoyancy force is linear with respect to the density of the liquid within which the float is submerged, the measure of the buoyancy force yields a measure of the density of the liquid. One commercially available unit claims the instrument is capable of measuring relative density with an accuracy of ± 0.005 RD units. The submersible probe head contains a mathematically characterized spring-float system. When the head is immersed vertically in the liquid, the float moves vertically and the position of the float controls the position of a permanent magnet whose displacement is sensed by a concentric array of Hall-effect linear displacement sensors. The output signals of the sensors are mixed in a dedicated electronics module that provides a single output voltage whose magnitude is a direct linear measure of the quantity to be measured.

=== Relative density in soil mechanics ===
Relative density $D_\mathrm{R}$ a measure of the current void ratio in relation to the maximum and minimum void ratios, and applied effective stress control the mechanical behavior of cohesionless soil. Relative density is defined by
$$D_\mathrm{R}=\frac{e_\mathrm{max}-e}{e_\mathrm{max}-e_\mathrm{min}} \times 100\%$$
in which $e_\mathrm{max}, e_\mathrm{min}$, and $e$ are the maximum, minimum and actual void ratios.

=== Limitations ===
Relative density is a useful concept but has several limitations. One major issue is its sensitivity to temperature since the density of both the substance being measured and the reference changes with temperature, affecting accuracy. It also assumes materials are incompressible, which isn't true for gasses or some liquids under varying pressures. It doesn't provide detailed information about a material's composition or properties beyond density. Errors can also occur due to impurities, incomplete mixing, or air bubbles in liquids, which can skew results.

== Examples ==
Material	Relative Density
Balsa wood	0.2
Oak wood	0.75
Ethanol	0.78
Olive oil	0.91
Water	1
Black Ironwood	1.5
Graphite	1.9–2.3
Table salt	2.17
Quartz	2.65
Aluminium	2.7
Calcite	2.71
Aragonite	2.94
Cement	3.15
Iron	7.87
Copper	8.96
Lead	11.35
Mercury	13.56
Depleted uranium	19.1
Gold	19.3
Osmium	22.59

(Samples may vary, and these figures are approximate.)

Substances with a relative density of 1 are neutrally buoyant, those with RD greater than one are denser than water, and so (ignoring surface tension effects) will sink in it, and those with an RD of less than one are less dense than water, and so will float.

Example:
$$RD_\mathrm{H_2O} = \frac{\rho_\mathrm{Material}}{\rho_\mathrm{H_2O}} = RD,$$

Helium gas has a density of 0.164 g/L; it is 0.139 times as dense as air, which has a density of 1.18 g/L.

- Urine normally has a relative density between 1.003 and 1.030. The urine specific gravity diagnostic test is used to evaluate renal concentration ability for assessment of the urinary system. Low concentration may indicate diabetes insipidus, while high concentration may indicate albuminuria or glycosuria.
- Blood normally has a relative density of approximately 1.060.
- Vodka 80° proof (40% v/v) has a relative density of 0.9498.

== See also ==
- API gravity
- Baumé scale
- Buoyancy
- Fluid mechanics
- Gravity (beer)
- Hydrometer
- Jolly balance
- Plato scale
