= Delayed coker =

Oil refinery processing unit

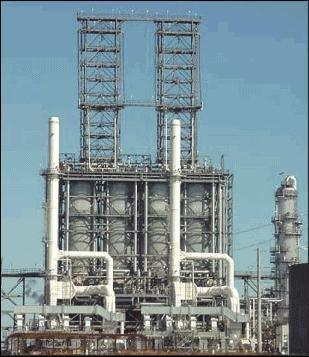
A 4-drum delayed coking unit in a petroleum refinery

A delayed coker is a type of coker whose process consists of heating a residual oil feed to its thermal cracking temperature in a furnace with multiple parallel passes. This cracks the heavy, long-chain hydrocarbon molecules of the residual oil into coker gas oil and petroleum coke.

Delayed coking is one of the unit processes used in many oil refineries. The adjacent photograph depicts a delayed coking unit with 4 drums. However, larger units have tandem pairs of drums, some with as many as 8 drums, each of which may have diameters of up to 10 meters and overall heights of up to 43 meters.

The yield of coke from the delayed coking process ranges from about 18 to 30 percent by weight of the feedstock residual oil, depending on the composition of the feedstock and the operating variables. Many refineries worldwide produce as much as 2,000 to 3,000 tons per day of petroleum coke and some produce even more.

== Schematic flow diagram and description ==
The flow diagram and description in this section are based on a delayed coking unit with a single pair of coke drums and one feedstock furnace. However, as mentioned above, larger units may have as many as 4 pairs of drums (8 drums in total) as well as a furnace for each pair of coke drums.

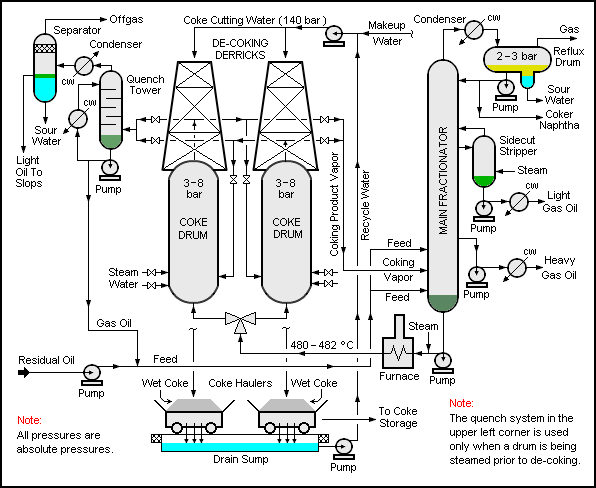
A delayed coking unit. A schematic flow diagram of such a unit, where residual oil enters the process at the lower left (see →), proceeds via pumps to the main fractionator (tall column at right), the residue of which, shown in green, is pumped via a furnace into the coke drums (two columns left and center) where the final carbonization takes place, at high temperature and pressure, in the presence of steam.

Residual oil from the vacuum distillation unit (sometimes including high-boiling oils from other sources within the refinery) is pumped into the bottom of the distillation column called the main fractionator. From there, it is pumped, along with some injected steam, into the fuel-fired furnace and heated to its thermal cracking temperature of about 480–505 °C. Thermal cracking begins in the pipe between the furnace and the coke drums, and finishes in the coke drum that is on-stream. The injected steam helps to minimize the deposition of coke within the furnace tubes ("delaying" the coking), by increasing the feed velocity, reducing residence time within the furnace.

Pumping the incoming residual oil into the bottom of the main fractionator, rather than directly into the furnace, preheats the residual oil by having it contact the hot vapors in the bottom of the fractionator. At the same time, some of the hot vapors condense into a high-boiling liquid which recycles back into the furnace along with the hot residual oil.

As cracking takes place in the drum, gas oil and lighter components are generated in vapor phase and separate from the liquid and solids. The drum effluent is vapor except for any liquid or solids entrainment, and is directed to main fractionator, where it is separated into the desired boiling-point fractions.

The solid coke is deposited and remains in the coke drum in a porous structure that allows flow through the pores. Depending on the overall coke-drum cycle being used, a coke drum may fill in 12 to 24 hours. Fixed and dynamic cycle times can be utilized.

After the first drum is full of the solidified coke, the hot mixture from the furnace is switched to the second drum. While the second drum is filling, the filled first drum is steamed out to reduce the hydrocarbon content of the petroleum coke, and then quenched with water to cool it. Quenching includes filling up, waiting several hours, and then draining the water. The top and bottom heads of the full coke drum are removed, and the solid petroleum coke is then cut from the coke drum with a high-pressure water jet, where it falls into a pit, pad, or sluiceway for reclamation to storage.

The decoking systems used for the coke removal usually consists of a high-pressure, high-flow centrifugal jet pump, piping systems, decoking valves, isolation and bleed valves, high-pressure hoses, crossheads, rotary joints, winches, rotating drill stems, and cutting tools (combined, or separate). Specialized valves called "decoking valves" are usually used to make the switching from boring to cutting possible.

== Composition of coke ==
The table below illustrates the wide range of compositions for raw petroleum coke (referred to as green coke) produced in a delayed coker and the corresponding compositions after the green coke has been calcined at 2375 °F (1302 °C):

Composition Of Coke From A Delayed Coker
Component	Green coke as produced	Coke calcined at 2375 °F
Fixed carbon, wt %	80 − 95	98.0 − 99.5
Hydrogen, wt %	3.0 − 4.5	0.1
Nitrogen, wt %	0.1 − 0.5	
Sulfur, wt %	0.2 − 6.0	
Volatile matter, wt %	5 − 15	0.2 − 0.8
Moisture, wt %	0.5 − 10	0.1
Ash, wt %	0.1 − 1.0	0.02 − 0.7
Density, g/cm^{3}	1.2 − 1.6	1.9 − 2.1
Metals, ppm weight:		
Aluminum	15 − 100	15 − 100
Boron	0.1 − 15	0.1 − 15
Calcium	25 − 500	25 − 500
Chromium	5 − 50	5 − 50
Cobalt	10 − 60	10 − 60
Iron	50 − 5000	50 − 5000
Manganese	2 − 100	2 − 100
Magnesium	10 − 250	10 − 250
Molybdenum	10 − 20	10 − 20
Nickel	10 − 500	10 − 500
Potassium	20 − 50	20 − 50
Silicon	50 − 600	50 − 600
Sodium	40 − 70	40 − 70
Titanium	2 − 60	2 − 60
Vanadium	5 − 500	5 − 500

== History ==
Petroleum coke was first made in the 1860s in the early oil refineries in Pennsylvania which boiled oil in small, iron distillation stills to recover kerosene, a much-needed lamp oil. The stills were heated by wood or coal fires built underneath them, which over-heated and coked the oil near the bottom. After the distillation was completed, the still was allowed to cool, and workmen could then dig out the coke and tar.

- In 1913, William Merriam Burton, working as a chemist for the Standard Oil of Indiana refinery at Whiting, Indiana, was granted a patent for the Burton thermal cracking process that he had developed. He was later to become the president of Standard Oil of Indiana before he retired.
- In 1929, based on the Burton thermal cracking process, Standard Oil of Indiana built the first delayed coker. It required very arduous manual decoking.
- In the late 1930s, Shell oil developed hydraulic decoking using high-pressure water at their refinery in Wood River, Illinois. That made it possible, by having two coke drums, for delayed decoking to become a semi-continuous process.
- From 1955 onwards, growth in the use of delayed coking increased.
- As of 2002, there were 130 petroleum refineries worldwide producing 172,000 tons per day of petroleum coke. Included in those worldwide data, about 59 coking units were operating in the United States and producing 114,000 tons per day of coke.

== Uses of petroleum coke ==
The product coke from a delayed coker has many commercial uses and applications. The largest use is as a fuel.

The uses for green coke are:

- As fuel for space heaters, large industrial steam generators, fluidized bed combustion, integrated gasification combined cycle (IGCC) units, and cement kilns
- In silicon carbide foundries
- For producing blast furnace coke

The uses for calcined coke are:

- As anodes in the production of aluminium
- In the production of titanium dioxide
- As a carbon raiser in cast iron and steel making
- Producing graphite electrodes and other graphite products such as graphite brushes used in electrical equipment
- In carbon structural materials

== Other processes for producing petroleum coke ==
There are other petroleum refining processes for producing petroleum coke, namely the Fluid Coking and Flexicoking processes, both of which were developed and are licensed by ExxonMobil Research and Engineering. The first commercial unit went into operation in 1955. Forty-three years later, as of 1998, there were 18 of these units operating worldwide, of which 6 were in the United States.

There are other similar coking processes, but they do not produce petroleum coke, such as the Lurgi-VZK Flash Coker, which produces coke by the pyrolysis of biomass.
