= Petroleum coke =

Solid carbon-rich material

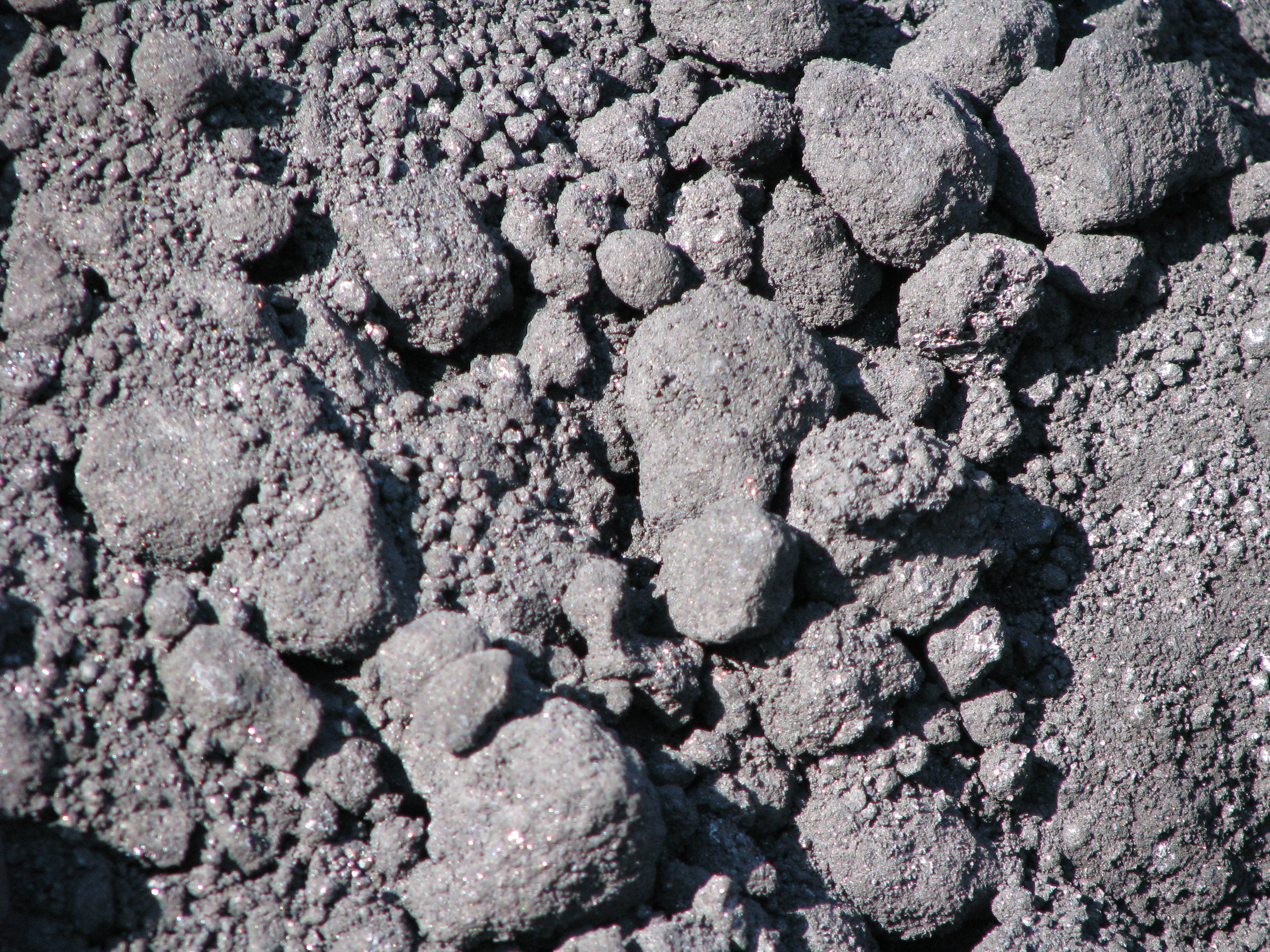
Petroleum coke

Petroleum coke, abbreviated coke, pet coke or petcoke, is a final carbon-rich solid material that derives from oil refining, and is one type of the group of fuels referred to as cokes. Petcoke is the coke that, in particular, derives from a final cracking process—a thermo-based chemical engineering process that splits long chain hydrocarbons of petroleum into shorter chains—that takes place in units termed coker units. (Other types of coke are derived from coal.) Stated succinctly, coke is the "carbonization product of high-boiling hydrocarbon fractions obtained in petroleum processing (heavy residues)". Petcoke is also produced in the production of synthetic crude oil (syncrude) from bitumen extracted from Canada's oil sands and from Venezuela's Orinoco oil sands. In petroleum coker units, residual oils from other distillation processes used in petroleum refining are treated at a high temperature and pressure leaving the petcoke after driving off gases and volatiles, and separating off remaining light and heavy oils. These processes are termed "coking processes", and most typically employ chemical engineering plant operations for the specific process of delayed coking.

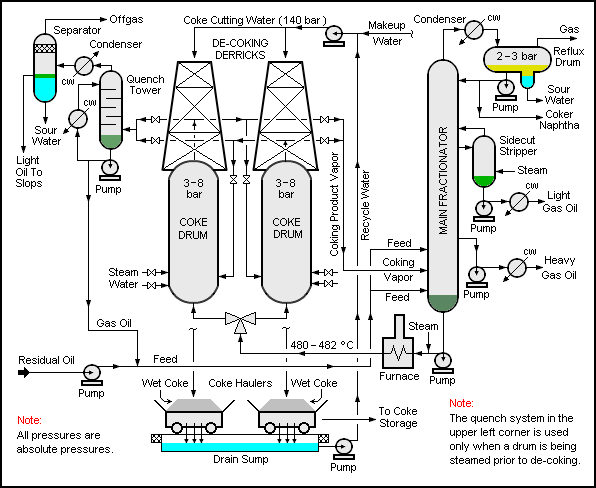
A delayed coking unit.A schematic flow diagram of such a unit, where residual oil enters the process at the lower left (see →), proceeds via pumps to the main fractionator (tall column at right), the residue of which, shown in green, is pumped via a furnace into the coke drums (two columns left and center) where the final carbonization takes place, at high temperature and pressure, in the presence of steam.

This coke can either be fuel grade (high in sulfur and metals) or anode grade (low in sulfur and metals). The raw coke directly out of the coker is often referred to as green coke. In this context, "green" means unprocessed. The further processing of green coke by calcining in a rotary kiln removes residual volatile hydrocarbons from the coke. The calcined petroleum coke can be further processed in an anode baking oven to produce anode coke of the desired shape and physical properties. The anodes are mainly used in the aluminium and steel industry.

Petcoke is over 80% carbon and emits 5% to 10% more carbon dioxide (CO_{2}) than coal on a per-unit-of-energy basis when it is burned. As petcoke has a higher energy content, petcoke emits between 30% and 80% more CO_{2} than coal per unit of weight. The difference between coal and coke in CO_{2} production per unit of energy produced depends upon the moisture in the coal, which increases the CO_{2} per unit of energy – heat of combustion – and on the volatile hydrocarbons in coal and coke, which decrease the CO_{2} per unit of energy.

== Types ==
There are at least three basic types of petroleum coke: needle coke, sponge coke, and shot coke. Different types of petroleum coke have different microstructures due to differences in operating variables and nature of feedstock. Significant differences are also to be observed in the properties of the different types of coke, particularly ash and volatile matter contents.

Needle coke, also called acicular coke, is a highly crystalline petroleum coke used in the production of electrodes for the steel and aluminium industries and is particularly valuable because the electrodes must be replaced regularly. Needle coke is produced exclusively from either fluid catalytic cracking (FCC) decant oil or coal tar pitch.

== Composition ==
Petcoke, altered through the process of calcining which it is heated or refined raw coke eliminates much of the component of the resource. Usually petcoke when refined does not release the heavy metals as volatiles or emissions.

Depending on the petroleum feed stock used, the percentage of carbon in petcoke can be as high as 98-99%. This creates a carbon-based compound containing hydrogen in concentrations between 3.0 – 4.0%. Raw (or green) coke contains between 0.1 – 0.5% nitrogen and 0.2 – 6.0% sulfur which become emissions when coke is calcined.

Composition of raw petcoke
Component	Raw (green) coke
Carbon (wt%)	80 - 95
Hydrogen (wt%)	3.0 - 4.5
Nitrogen (wt%)	0.1 - 0.5
Sulfur (wt%)	0.2 - 6.0
Volatile matter (wt%)	5.0 - 15
Moisture (wt%)	0.5 - 10
Ash (wt%)	0.1 - 1.0
Density (wt%)	1.2 - 1.6
Heavy Metals (ppm. wt)
Aluminium	15 - 100
Boron	0.1 - 15
Calcium	25 - 500
Chromium	5 - 50
Cobalt	10 - 60
Iron	50 - 5000
Manganese	2 - 100
Magnesium	10 - 250
Molybdenum	10 - 20
Nickel	10 - 500
Potassium	20 - 50
Silicon	50 - 600
Sodium	40 - 70
Titanium	2 - 60
Vanadium	5 - 500

Through thermal processing the composition in weight is reduced with the volatile matter and sulfur being emitted. This process ends in the honeycomb petcoke which according to the name giving is a solid carbon structure with holes in it.

Component	Petcoke (Calcined @ 2375 °F = 1300 °C)
Carbon (wt%)	98.0 - 99.5
Hydrogen (wt%)	0.1
Nitrogen (wt%)	
Sulfur (wt%)	
Volatile matter (wt%)	0.2 - 0.8
Moisture (wt%)	0.1
Ash (wt%)	0.02 - 0.7
Density (wt%)	1.9 - 2.1
Heavy Metals (ppm. wt)
Aluminium	15 - 100
Boron	0.1 - 15
Calcium	25 - 500
Chromium	5 - 50
Cobalt	10 - 60
Iron	50 - 5000
Manganese	2 - 100
Magnesium	10 - 250
Molybdenum	10 - 20
Nickel	10 - 500
Potassium	20 - 50
Silicon	50 - 600
Sodium	40 - 70
Titanium	2 - 60
Vanadium	5 - 500

== Fuel-grade ==
Fuel-grade coke is classified as either sponge coke or shot coke morphology. While oil refiners have been producing coke for over 100 years, the mechanisms that cause sponge coke or shot coke to form are not well understood and cannot be accurately predicted. In general, lower temperatures and higher pressures promote sponge coke formation. Additionally, the amount of heptane insolubles present and the fraction of light components in the coker feed contribute.

While its high heat and low ash content make it a decent fuel for power generation in coal-fired boilers, petroleum coke is high in sulfur and low in volatile content, and this poses environmental (and technical) problems with its combustion. Its gross calorific value (HHV) is nearly 8000 Kcal/kg which is twice the value of average coal used in electricity generation. A common choice of sulfur recovering unit for burning petroleum coke is the SNOX Flue gas desulfurisation technology, which is based on the well-known WSA Process. Fluidized bed combustion is commonly used to burn petroleum coke. Gasification is increasingly used with this feedstock (often using gasifiers placed in the refineries themselves).

== Calcined ==
Calcined petroleum coke (CPC) is the product from calcining petroleum coke. This coke is the product of the coker unit in a crude oil refinery. The calcined petroleum coke is used to make anodes for the aluminium, steel and titanium smelting industry and as the feed stock for the production of synthetic graphite. The green coke must have sufficiently low metal content to be used as anode material. Green coke with this low metal content is called anode-grade coke. When green coke has excessive metal content, it is not calcined and is used as fuel-grade coke in furnaces.

== Desulfurization ==
A high sulfur content in petcoke reduces its market value, and may preclude its use as fuel due to restrictions on sulfur oxides emissions for environmental reasons. Methods have thus been proposed to reduce or eliminate the sulfur content of petcoke. Most of them involve the desorption of the inorganic sulfur present in the pores or surface of the coke, and the partition and removal of organic sulfur compounds, such as sulfurous aromatic heterocycles.

Potential petroleum desulfurization techniques can be classified as follows:

1. Solvent extraction
2. Chemical treatment
3. Thermal desulfurization
4. Desulfurization in an oxidizing atmosphere
5. Desulfurization in an atmosphere of sulfur-bearing gas
6. Desulfurization in an atmosphere of hydrocarbon gases
7. Hydrodesulfurization

As of 2011 there was no commercial process available to desulfurize petcoke.

== Storage, disposal, and sale ==
Nearly pure carbon, petcoke is a potent source of carbon dioxide if burned.

Petroleum coke may be stored in a pile near an oil refinery pending sale. For example, in 2013 a large stockpile owned by Koch Carbon near the Detroit River was produced by a Marathon Petroleum refinery in Detroit which had begun refining bitumen from the oil sands of Alberta in November 2012. Large stockpiles of petcoke also existed in Canada as of 2013, and China and Mexico were markets for petcoke exported from California to be used as fuel. As of 2013 Oxbow Corporation, owned by William I. Koch, was a major dealer in petcoke, selling 11 million tons annually.

In 2017, a quarter of US exports of the fuel went to India, an Associated Press investigation found. In 2016, this amounted to more than eight million metric tons, more than 20 times as much as in 2010. India's Environmental Pollution Control Authority tested imported petcoke in use near New Delhi, and found sulfur levels 17 times the legal limit.

The International Convention for Prevention of Pollution from Ships (MARPOL 73/78), adopted by the International Maritime Organization (IMO), has mandated that marine vessels shall not consume residual fuel oils (bunker fuel, etc) with a sulfur content greater than 0.5% from the year 2020. Nearly 38% of residual fuel oils are consumed in the shipping sector. In the process of converting excess residual oils into lighter oils by coking processes, pet coke is generated as a byproduct. Pet coke availability is expected to increase in the future due to falling demand for residual oil. Pet coke is also used in methanation plants to produce synthetic natural gas, etc. in order to avoid a pet coke disposal problem.

== Health hazards ==
Petroleum coke is sometimes a source of fine dust, which can penetrate the filtering process of the human airway, lodge in the lungs and cause serious health problems. Studies have shown that petroleum coke itself has a low level of toxicity and there is no evidence of carcinogenicity.

Petroleum coke can contain vanadium, a toxic metal. Vanadium was found in the dust collected in occupied dwellings near the petroleum coke stored next to the Detroit River. Vanadium is toxic in tiny quantities, 0.8 micrograms per cubic meter of air, according to the EPA.

According to multiple EPA studies and analyses, petroleum coke has a low health hazard potential in humans. It does not have any observable carcinogenic, developmental, or reproductive effects. During animal case studies repeated-dose chronic inhalation did show respiratory inflammation due to dust particles, but not specific to petroleum coke.

=== Environmental hazards ===
Environmental concerns stem from the storage and combustion of petcoke. By-waste accumulates as petcoke is processed, making waste management an issue. Petcoke's high silt content of 21.2% increases the risk of fugitive dust drifting away from petcoke mounds under heavy wind. An estimated 100 tons of petcoke fugitive dust including PM10 and PM2.5 are released into the atmosphere per year in the United States. Waste management and release of fugitive dust is especially an issue in the cities of Chicago, Detroit and Green Bay.

Externalities stem from petcoke that cause potential environmental impacts. Petcoke is composed of 90% elemental carbon by weight which is converted to CO_{2} during combustion. Use of petcoke also produces emissions of sulfur, and the potential for water pollution through nickel and vanadium runoff from refining and storage.

== See also ==
- Air pollution in India
- Coke (fuel) – Coal product used in the process of making steel
- Cooler for calcined petroleum coke
- Delayed coker – Oil refinery processing unit
- Greenhouse gas emissions – Greenhouse gases emitted from human activities
- Orimulsion – Registered trademark name for a bitumen-based fuel
- Tar
