= Cracking (chemistry) =

Process breaking down complex organic molecules into simpler ones

In petrochemistry, petroleum geology and organic chemistry, cracking is the process whereby complex organic molecules such as kerogens or long-chain hydrocarbons are broken down into simpler molecules such as light hydrocarbons, by the breaking of carbon–carbon bonds in the precursors. The rate of cracking and the end products are strongly dependent on the temperature and presence of catalysts. Cracking is the breakdown of large hydrocarbons into smaller, more useful alkanes and alkenes. Simply put, hydrocarbon cracking is the process of breaking long-chain hydrocarbons into short ones. This process requires high temperatures.

More loosely, outside the field of petroleum chemistry, the term "cracking" is used to describe any type of splitting of molecules under the influence of heat, catalysts and solvents, such as in processes of destructive distillation or pyrolysis.

Fluid catalytic cracking produces a high yield of petrol and LPG, while hydrocracking is a major source of jet fuel, diesel fuel, naphtha, and again yields LPG.

== History and patents ==
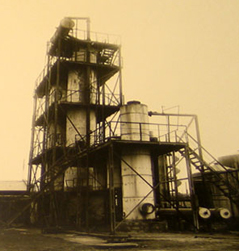
Refinery using the Shukhov cracking process, Baku, Soviet Union, 1934

A thermal cracking process was applied to animal fats and other organic substances by William Henry in 1805. In 1865 James Young cracked paraffin oil and obtained a patent for a cracking process for oil. Among several variants of thermal cracking methods (variously known as the "Shukhov cracking process", "Burton cracking process", "Burton–Humphreys cracking process", and "Dubbs cracking process") Vladimir Shukhov, a Russian engineer, invented and patented one of the first in 1891 (Russian Empire, patent no. 12926, November 7, 1891). One installation was used to a limited extent in Russia, but development was not followed up. In the first decade of the 20th century the American engineers William Merriam Burton and Robert E. Humphreys independently developed and patented a similar process as U.S. patent 1,049,667 on June 8, 1908. Among its advantages was that both the condenser and the boiler were continuously kept under pressure.

In its earlier versions it was a batch process, rather than continuous, and many patents were to follow in the US and Europe, though not all were practical. In 1924, a delegation from the American Sinclair Oil Corporation visited Shukhov. Sinclair Oil apparently wished to suggest that the patent of Burton and Humphreys, in use by Standard Oil, was derived from Shukhov's patent for oil cracking, as described in the Russian patent. If that could be established, it could strengthen the hand of rival American companies wishing to invalidate the Burton–Humphreys patent. In the event Shukhov satisfied the Americans that in principle Burton's method closely resembled his 1891 patents, though his own interest in the matter was primarily to establish that "the Russian oil industry could easily build a cracking apparatus according to any of the described systems without being accused by the Americans of borrowing for free".

At that time, just a few years after the Russian Revolution and Russian Civil War, the Soviet Union was desperate to develop industry and earn foreign exchange. The Soviet oil industry eventually did obtain much of their technology from foreign companies, largely American ones. At about that time, fluid catalytic cracking was being explored and developed and soon replaced most of the purely thermal cracking processes in the fossil fuel processing industry. The replacement was not complete; many types of cracking, including pure thermal cracking, still are in use, depending on the nature of the feedstock and the products required to satisfy market demands. Thermal cracking remains important, for example, in producing naphtha, gas oil, and coke; more sophisticated forms of thermal cracking have since been developed for various purposes. These include visbreaking, steam cracking, and coking.

== Cracking methodologies ==
=== Thermal cracking ===
Modern high-pressure thermal cracking operates at absolute pressures of about 7,000 kilopascals (1,000 psi). An overall process of disproportionation can be observed, where "light", hydrogen-rich products are formed at the expense of heavier molecules which condense and are depleted of hydrogen. The actual reaction is known as homolytic fission and produces alkenes, which are the basis for the economically important production of polymers.

Thermal cracking is currently used to "upgrade" very heavy fractions or to produce light fractions or distillates, burner fuel and/or petroleum coke. Two extremes of the thermal cracking in terms of the product range are represented by the high-temperature process called "steam cracking" or pyrolysis (ca. 750 to 900 °C [1,380 to 1,650 °F] or higher) which produces valuable ethylene and other feedstocks for the petrochemical industry, and the milder-temperature delayed coking (ca. 500 °C [932 °F]) which can produce, under the right conditions, valuable needle coke, a highly crystalline petroleum coke used in the production of electrodes for the steel and aluminium industries.

William Merriam Burton developed one of the earliest thermal cracking processes in 1912 which operated at 700–750 °F (370–400 °C) and an absolute pressure of 620 kilopascals (90 psi) and was known as the Burton process. Shortly thereafter, in 1921, C.P. Dubbs, an employee of the Universal Oil Products Company, developed a somewhat more advanced thermal cracking process which operated at 750–860 °F (400–460 °C) and was known as the Dubbs process. The Dubbs process was used extensively by many refineries until the early 1940s when catalytic cracking came into use.

=== Steam cracking ===
Steam cracking is a petrochemical process in which saturated hydrocarbons are broken down into smaller, often unsaturated, hydrocarbons. It is the principal industrial method for producing the lighter alkenes (or commonly olefins), including ethene (or ethylene) and propene (or propylene). Steam cracker units are facilities in which a feedstock such as naphtha, liquefied petroleum gas (LPG), ethane, propane or butane is thermally cracked through the use of steam in a bank of pyrolysis furnaces to produce lighter hydrocarbons.

In steam cracking, a gaseous or liquid hydrocarbon feed like naphtha, LPG or ethane is diluted with steam and briefly heated in a furnace without the presence of oxygen. Typically, the reaction temperature is very high, at around 850 °C (1,560 °F), but the reaction is only allowed to take place very briefly. In modern cracking furnaces, the residence time is reduced to milliseconds to improve yield, resulting in gas velocities up to the speed of sound. After the cracking temperature has been reached, the gas is quickly quenched to stop the reaction in a transfer line heat exchanger or inside a quenching header using quench oil.

The products produced in the reaction depend on the composition of the feed, the hydrocarbon-to-steam ratio, and on the cracking temperature and furnace residence time. Light hydrocarbon feeds such as ethane, LPGs or light naphtha give product streams rich in the lighter alkenes, including ethylene, propylene, and butadiene. Heavier hydrocarbon (full range and heavy naphthas as well as other refinery products) feeds give some of these, but also give products rich in aromatic hydrocarbons and hydrocarbons suitable for inclusion in gasoline or fuel oil. Typical product streams include pyrolysis gasoline (pygas) and BTX.

A higher cracking temperature (also referred to as severity) favors the production of ethylene and benzene, whereas lower severity produces higher amounts of propylene, C4-hydrocarbons and liquid products. The process also results in the slow deposition of coke, a form of carbon, on the reactor walls. Since coke degrades the efficiency of the reactor, great care is taken to design reaction conditions to minimize its formation. Nonetheless, a steam cracking furnace can usually only run for a few months between de-cokings. "Decokes" require the furnace to be isolated from the process and then a flow of steam or a steam/air mixture is passed through the furnace coils. This decoking is essentially combustion of the carbons, converting the hard solid carbon layer to carbon monoxide and carbon dioxide.

=== Fluid catalytic cracking ===
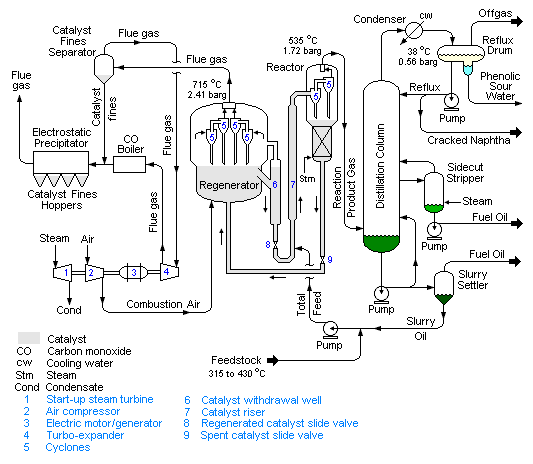
Schematic flow diagram of a fluid catalytic cracker

The catalytic cracking process involves the presence of solid acid catalysts, usually silica-alumina and zeolites. The catalysts promote the formation of carbocations, which undergo processes of rearrangement and scission of C-C bonds. Relative to thermal cracking, catalytic cracking proceeds at milder temperatures, which saves energy. Furthermore, by operating at lower temperatures, the yield of undesirable alkenes is diminished. Alkenes cause instability of hydrocarbon fuels.

Fluid catalytic cracking is a commonly used process, and a modern oil refinery will typically include a fluid catalytic cracker (sometimes cat cracker), particularly at refineries in the US, due to the high demand for gasoline. The process was first used around 1942 and employs a powdered catalyst. During WWII, the Allied Forces had plentiful supplies of the materials in contrast to the Axis Forces, which suffered severe shortages of gasoline and artificial rubber. Initial process implementations were based on low activity alumina catalyst and a reactor where the catalyst particles were suspended in a rising flow of feed hydrocarbons in a fluidized bed.

In newer designs, cracking takes place using a very active zeolite-based catalyst in a short-contact time vertical or upward-sloped pipe called the "riser". Pre-heated feed is sprayed into the base of the riser via feed nozzles where it contacts extremely hot fluidized catalyst at 666 to 760 °C (1,230 to 1,400 °F). The hot catalyst vaporizes the feed and catalyzes the cracking reactions that break down the high-molecular weight oil into lighter components including LPG, gasoline, and diesel. The catalyst-hydrocarbon mixture flows upward through the riser for a few seconds, and then the mixture is separated via cyclones. The catalyst-free hydrocarbons are routed to a main fractionator for separation into fuel gas, LPG, gasoline, naphtha, light cycle oils used in diesel and jet fuel, and heavy fuel oil.

During the trip up the riser, the cracking catalyst is "spent" by reactions which deposit coke on the catalyst and greatly reduce activity and selectivity. The "spent" catalyst (equilibrium catalyst) is disengaged from the cracked hydrocarbon vapors and sent to a stripper where it contacts steam to remove hydrocarbons remaining in the catalyst pores. The "spent" catalyst then flows into a fluidized-bed regenerator where air (or in some cases air plus oxygen) is used to burn off the coke to restore catalyst activity and also provide the necessary heat for the next reaction cycle, cracking being an endothermic reaction. The "regenerated" catalyst then flows to the base of the riser, repeating the cycle.

The gasoline produced in the FCC unit has an elevated octane rating but is less chemically stable compared to other gasoline components due to its olefinic profile. Olefins in gasoline are responsible for the formation of polymeric deposits in storage tanks, fuel ducts and injectors. The FCC LPG is an important source of C_{3}–C_{4} olefins and isobutane that are essential feeds for the alkylation process and the production of polymers such as polypropylene.

Typical yields of a UOP Fluid Catalytic Cracker (volume, feed basis, ~23 API feedstock and 74% conversion)

Feedstock	%	End Product	%
Mixed Gasoil with a Feed sg of 0.916	100	Offgas (methane, ethane, CO)	2.32
		C3 -C4 vol%	27.2
		Gasoline vol%	57.2
		Light Cycle Oil (diesel) vol%	17.1
		Clarified (slurry) oil vol%	8.9
		Coke wt%	5 estimated
Total	100	Total	117.2

==== Hydrocracking ====
Hydrocracking is a catalytic cracking process assisted by the presence of added hydrogen gas. Unlike a hydrotreater, hydrocracking uses hydrogen to break C–C bonds (hydrotreatment is conducted prior to hydrocracking to protect the catalysts in a hydrocracking process). In 2010, 265 million tonnes (261,000,000 long tons; 292,000,000 short tons) of petroleum was processed with this technology. The main feedstock is vacuum gas oil, a heavy fraction of petroleum.

The products of this process are saturated hydrocarbons; depending on the reaction conditions (temperature, pressure, catalyst activity) these products range from ethane and LPG to heavier hydrocarbons consisting mostly of isoparaffins. Hydrocracking is normally facilitated by a bifunctional catalyst that is capable of rearranging and breaking hydrocarbon chains as well as adding hydrogen to aromatics and olefins to produce naphthenes and alkanes.

The major products from hydrocracking are jet fuel and diesel, but low sulphur naphtha fractions and LPG are also produced. All these products have a very low content of sulfur and other contaminants with a goal of reducing the gasoil and naphtha range material to 10 PPM sulfur or lower. It is very common in Europe and Asia because those regions have high demand for diesel and kerosene. In the US, fluid catalytic cracking is more common because the demand for gasoline is higher.

The hydrocracking process depends on the nature of the feedstock and the relative rates of the two competing reactions, hydrogenation and cracking. Heavy aromatic feedstock is converted into lighter products under a wide range of very high pressures (6,900–13,800 kilopascals (1,000–2,000 psi)) and fairly high temperatures (399–816 °C; 750–1,500 °F), in the presence of hydrogen and special catalysts.

Indicative Isocracking (UOP VGO Hydrocracking) Yields

Feedstock: Russian VGO 18.5 API, 2.28% Sulfur by wt, 0.28% Nitrogen by wt, Wax 6.5% by wt.

Feedstock Distillation Curve

Feedstock Quality Cut %	Temp C (F)
Starting Temperature	435 °C (815 °F)
10	460 °C (860 °F)
30	485 °C (905 °F)
50	505 °C (941 °F)
70	525 °C (977 °F)
90	550 °C (1,022 °F)
End Point	600 °C (1,112 °F)

Products from a UOP Hydrocracker

Product	wt %	vol %
C5-180C	4.8	5.9
180-290C	15.4	17.4
290-370C	16.4	18.1
370-425C	13.7	15.0
425-475C	19.3	21.0
475C+	27.4	29.6
Total	97.0	107.0

Hydrocracking is (mostly) a licensed technology due to its complexity. Typically the licensor is also the catalyst provider. Also, unit internals can often be patented by the process licensors and are designed to support specific functions of the catalyst load. Currently, the major process licensors for hydrocracking are:

- UOP
- Axens
- Chevron Lummus Global
- Topsoe
- Shell Criterion
- Elessent (formerly DuPont)
- ExxonMobil (iso-dewaxing for lubricant hydrocracking)

== Fundamentals ==
Outside of the industrial sector, cracking of C−C and C−H bonds are rare chemical reactions. In principle, ethane can undergo homolysis:

CH_{3}CH_{3} → 2 CH_{3}⋅

Because C−C bond energy is so high (377 kJ/mol), this reaction is not observed under laboratory conditions. More common examples of cracking reactions involve retro-Diels–Alder reactions. Illustrative is the thermal cracking of dicyclopentadiene to produce cyclopentadiene.

== See also ==
- Steam reforming
- Catalytic reforming
