= List of articles about Canadian oil sands =

This is a list of articles related to Canadian oil sands:

- Athabasca oil sands
- Black Bonanza
- BP § Canadian oil sands
- Canadian Centre for Energy Information
- Canadian oil sands (disambiguation)
- Climate change in Canada
- Cold Lake oil sands
- Environmental impact of mining
- History of Alberta § oil sands
- History of the petroleum industry in Canada (oil sands and heavy oil)
- Indiana Economic Development Corporation
- Keystone Pipeline
- Mackenzie Valley Pipeline
- Melville Island oil sands
- Oil megaprojects (2011)
- Peace River oil sands
- Project Oilsand / Project Cauldron
- Rising Tide North America
- Suncor Energy
- Syncrude Tailings Dam
- Utah Oil Sands Joint Venture
- Wabasco oil sands
- Yinka Dene Alliance

== See also ==
- Mitch Daniels
- Thomas Homer-Dixon
- Mike Hudema
- Emily Hunter
- Nikolai Kudryavtsev
- Andrew Nikiforuk
- Georg Naumann (Pioneer of the early use of natural gas)
