= Canadian oil sands =

Canadian oil sands may refer to:

- Athabasca oil sands.
- Peace River or Cold Lake where other bitumen deposits are located
- Fort McMurray where the industry is located
- Canadian Oil Sands Trust

== See also ==
- Oil sands
- Bitumen
- Heavy crude oil
