= Peace River oil sands =

Oil sands deposit

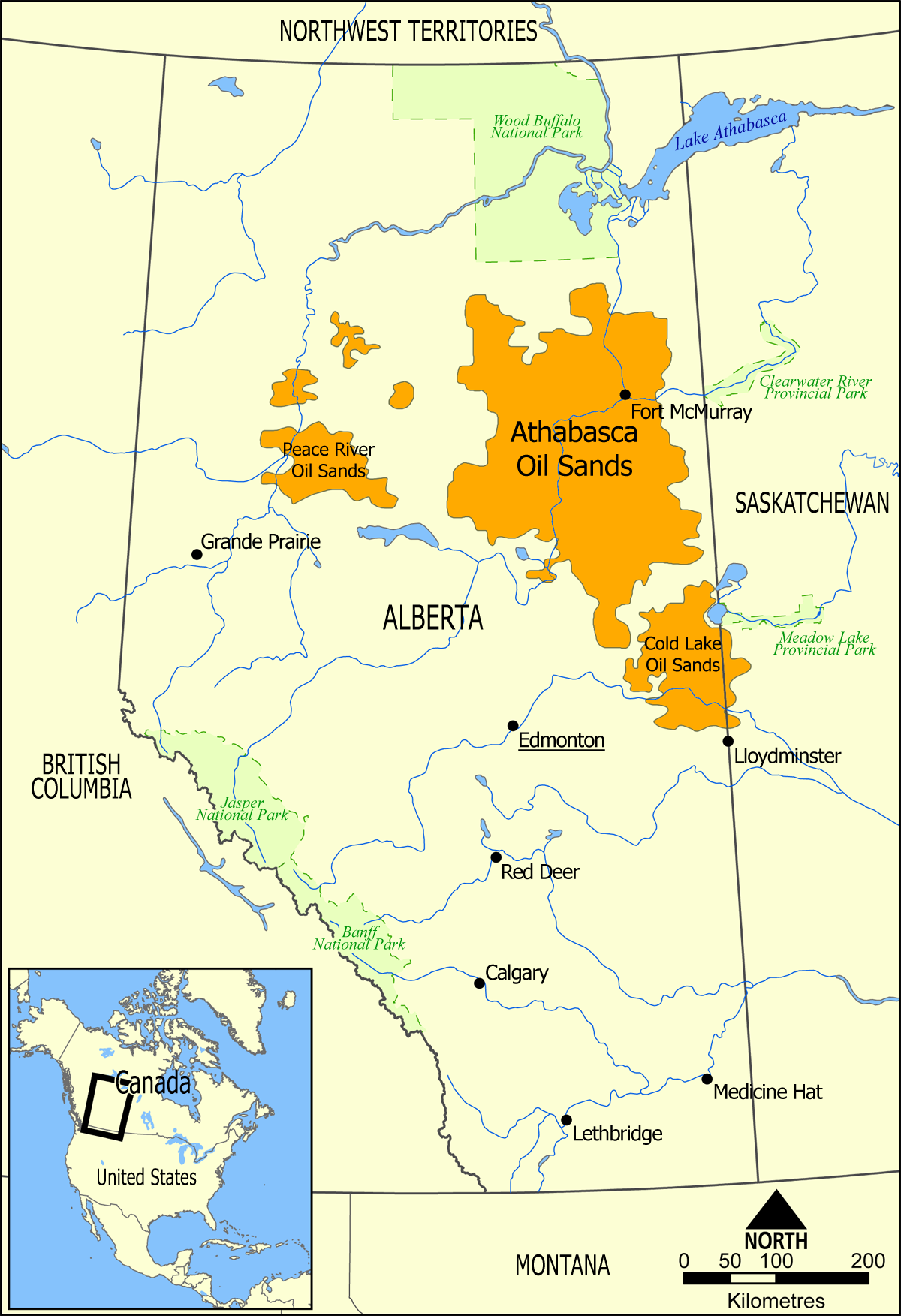
- The Peace River oil sands deposit lies in the west of Alberta, and is deeper than the larger, better known Athabasca oil sands.
- Country: Canada
- Region: northwest-central Alberta
- Offshore/onshore: Onshore, unconventional
- Operators: Baytex Energy,

Located in northwest-central Alberta, the Peace River oil sands deposit is the smallest of four large deposits of oil sands of the Western Canadian Sedimentary Basin formation.

The Peace River oil sands lie, generally, in the watershed of the Peace River.

The Peace River oil sands deposits are the smallest in the province. The largest, the Athabasca oil sands, are located to the east. The second largest, the Cold Lake oil sands deposit, is south of Athabaska and the Wabasco oil sands are south of Athabaska and usually linked to it. According to the Petroleum Economist, oil sands occur in more than 70 countries, but the bulk is found in these four regions, together covering an area of some 77,000 square kilometres (30,000 sq mi). In 2007, the World Energy Council estimated that these oil sands areas contained at least two-thirds of the world's discovered bitumen in place at the time, with an original oil-in-place (OOIP) reserve of 260,000,000,000 cubic metres (9.2×10^{12} cu ft) (1.6 trn barrels), an amount comparable to the total world reserves of conventional oil.

Whereas the Athabasca oil sands lie close enough to the surface that the sand can be scooped up in open-pit mines, and brought to a central location for processing, the Peace River deposits are considered too deep and are exploited in situ using steam-assisted gravity drainage (SAGD) and Cold Heavy Oil Production with Sand (CHOPS).

== History ==
By 1973 the importance of the Alberta oil sands was already realized as an enormous back up supply but was considered to be the second line of defence in comparison to the oil shales of western Colorado and parts of Utah and Wyoming. The Peace River oil deposits production followed technological advances. In 1977 Strausz published his article on the chemistry of the oil sands, then also known as the tar sands attending the conference that year entitled the Symposium on Tar Sand and Oil Shale.

By 2003 with the rising price of oil, and the improvement of enhanced recovery techniques such as thermal in-situ methods, the Peace River oil sands had become much more viable. Capital expenditure increased between 2006 and 2015 totalling $125 billion in all oil sands projects leading to a severe labor shortage in Alberta and driven unemployment rates to their lowest level in history – the lowest of all 10 Canadian provinces and 50 U.S. states.

== Oil production ==
The development of new technologies and adaptation in older technologies have made the exploited of the Peace River oil deposits possible. The primary methods are in situ using steam-assisted gravity drainage(SAGD) and Cold Heavy Oil Production with Sand (CHOPS).

=== Steam-assisted gravity drainage ===
Whereas the Athabasca oil sands lie close enough to the surface that the sand can be scooped up in open-pit mines, and brought to a central location for processing, the Peace River deposits are considered too deep. They are exploited in situ using steam-assisted gravity drainage (SAGD) heating through the injection of steam, that reduces the bitumen's viscosity, allowing it to be pumped to the surface. According to PREDA,

These oil sands consist of deposits of underground bitumen; thick heavy oil within a sand reservoir. Shell Canada developed these deposits by injecting steam under pressure into the ground to separate the bitumen from the sand. It may take several months of steam heating to enable the bitumen to be pumped up through the well. As the well cools, production declines, at which time the cycle begins anew.

— PREDA 2010

=== Cold Heavy Oil Production with Sand ===
Cold Heavy Oil Production with Sand (CHOPS) is one of the primary methods of production.

One of the primary methods used to extract heavy oil in the Peace River area is cold heavy oil production with sand (CHOPS). The process depends on heavy oil that is viscous enough to flow under normal operating conditions such that the application of heat through steam injection is not required. The process allows for the deliberate introduction of sand into the well along with the heavy oil to increase oil recovery. The sand and heavy oil are brought to the surface and separated in storage tanks.

— Dusseault 2002 cited in Munro 2013

== See also ==
- Athabasca oil sands
- Cold Lake oil sands
- Melville Island oil sands
- Wabasca oil sands
- List of articles about Canadian oil sands
