= Utah Oil Sands Joint Venture =

The Utah Oil Sands Joint Venture is a joint venture between Nevtah Capital Management, Inc., and Black Sands Energy Corp. to develop oil sands resources at the Uintah Basin in Utah.

== History ==
Oil-sands extraction in Utah started in the 1960s when two extraction plants were constructed. Western Industries opened a strip-mine and built a pilot plant along the east side of the Whiterocks River and Major Oil Company opened a strip-mine and built a pilot plant on the west side off the Whiterocks River. In 2005, Nevtah Capital Management and Cassandra Energy (now: Black Sands Energy) formed a joint venture to develop Utah's oil sands and opened a pilot plant at the Asphalt Ridge lease location. The pilot plant became in operation in November 2005.

== Technology ==
The joint venture uses closed-loop solvent extraction process originally proven by X-TRAC Energy in Wyoming in 1998, with a full-scale production plant. Black Sands Energy has exclusive rights to a technology.

The above-ground extraction process dissolute crushed, 1" minus oil sands materials through contact with a benign non-toxic solvent in an enclosed extractor vessel at temperatures up to 300 °F (149 °C) at near-atmospheric pressures. As the material dissolves, it is passed to a wash chamber where any remaining oil is removed. The oil-free sand is then desolventized with heat, which converts the liquid solvent to a gas, leaving dry solids suitable for mine backfill. The solvent-oil mixture is pumped into a critical unit for the removal of asphalt and oil from the solvent through heating and cooling. The recovered solvent is compressed back to a liquid, cooled and re-circulated to the extractor vessel in an endless loop. The system consists of only few moving parts and it operates on a gravity principle. Since the process does not use water to recover the oil, energy requirements are minimal.

== Operations ==
The partnership holds the rights to 13 oil sands leases in Utah consisting of 11,535 acres (46.68 km^{2}) containing over 650,000,000 bbl of recoverable oil.

The joint venture owns a 200 bbl per day mobile pilot plant and preparing a 2,000 bbl per day commercial production unit. The production capacity is expected to increase up 50,000 bbl per day by the end of 2009. The system has been improved to maintain processing levels at cold temperatures. A steam jacket has been installed which creates drier sand and keeps the pumps, plumbing and the extraction chamber warmer during standby time, minimizing warm-up time. System performance has improved with the installation of more powerful pumps and additional sensors for better indications of mass flow, temperature and material levels. The upgraded process control provides more precise data required in order to measure the system's performance.

== Partnership ==
The partnership is between Nevtah Capital Management, Inc., and Black Sands Energy Corp. The extraction technology is provided by development by Black Sands Energy and the financing is provided by Nevtah Capital Management. On 12 January 2007, Nevtah Capital Management and Black Sands Energy announced a joint venture agreement with Korea Technology Industry. According to the agreement, Korea Technology Industry provides $19 million for the development of the Whiterocks Deposit, in exchange of 50% of net profit. The joint venture agreement is limited to 100 million barrels of oil.

== See also ==
- Utah oil sands
- List of articles about Canadian tar sands
