= Wabasca oil field =

Oil field in Northern Alberta, Canada

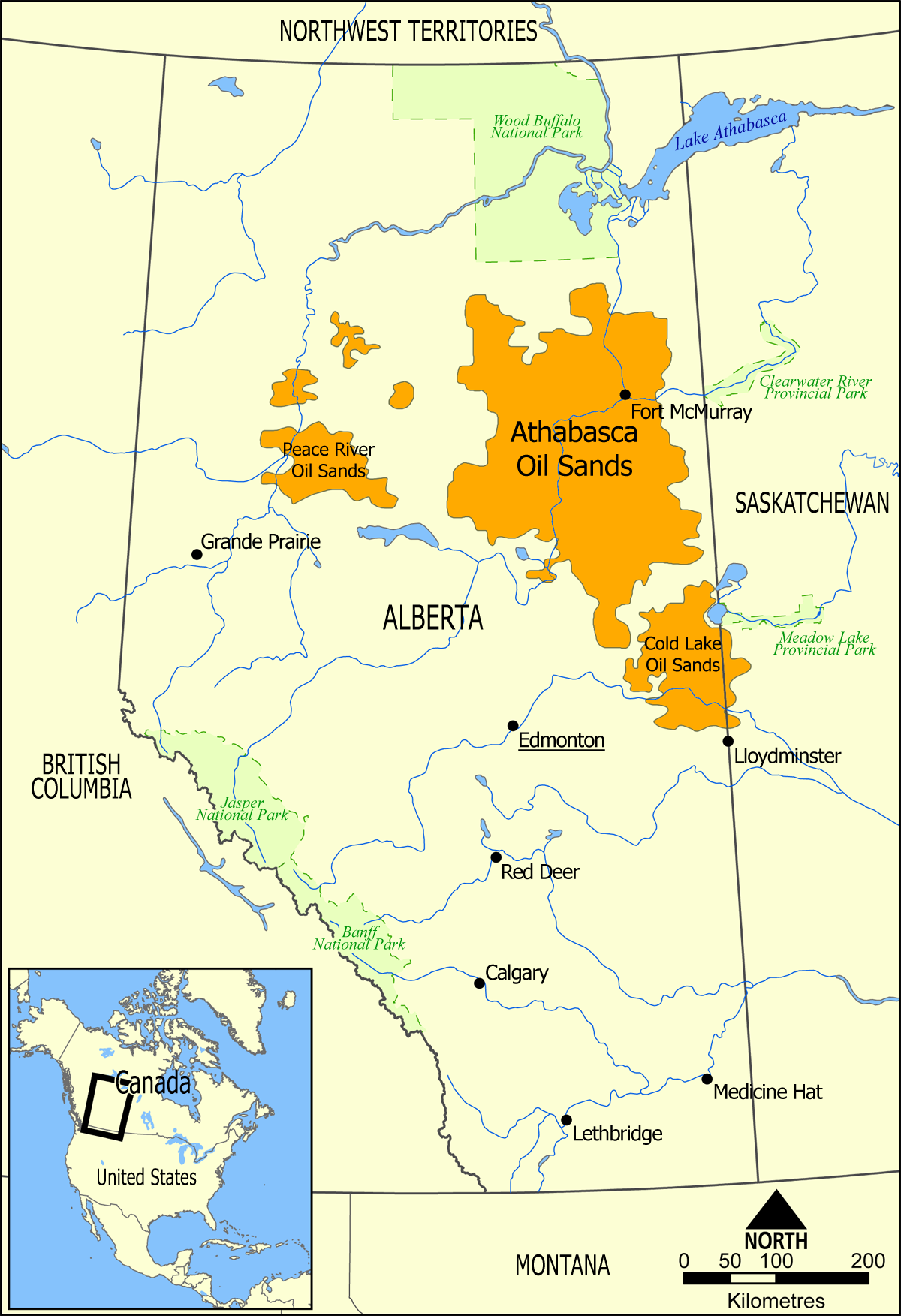
- Location of the Wabasca oil field in Alberta

- Location of the Wabasca oil field in Canada
- Country: Canada
- Region: Northern Alberta
- Offshore/onshore: Onshore
- Coordinates: 56.07°N 113.3°W
- Operators: EnCana; CNRL

Production
- Producing formations: Wabiskaw

Wabasca is an oil field in a remote area of northern Alberta, Canada. It is the fourth largest deposit of oil sands located in Alberta, located southwest of the larger Athabasca oil sands deposit. It is also known as the Pelican Lake Oilfield.

The closest community is Wabasca. The field is located east of this hamlet, and is spread over a surface of approximately 2,000 square kilometres (770 sq mi) of boreal forest and muskeg. Most oil is produced from the Wabiskaw Sandstone, formation equivalent to the one excavated in the Athabasca Oil Sands, but from sub-surface. While services are located in the nearby hamlet of Wabasca, the oil field is also served by the Pelican Airport. Most interests in this area are owned by Canadian Natural Resources, who purchased Cenovus Energy's operations in the area in 2017.

== See also ==
- Athabasca oil sands
- Cold Lake oil sands
- Melville Island oil sands
- Peace River oil sands
- List of articles about Canadian tar sands
- Petroleum production in Canada
