= Utah oil sands =

Collection of oil sands in Utah, USA

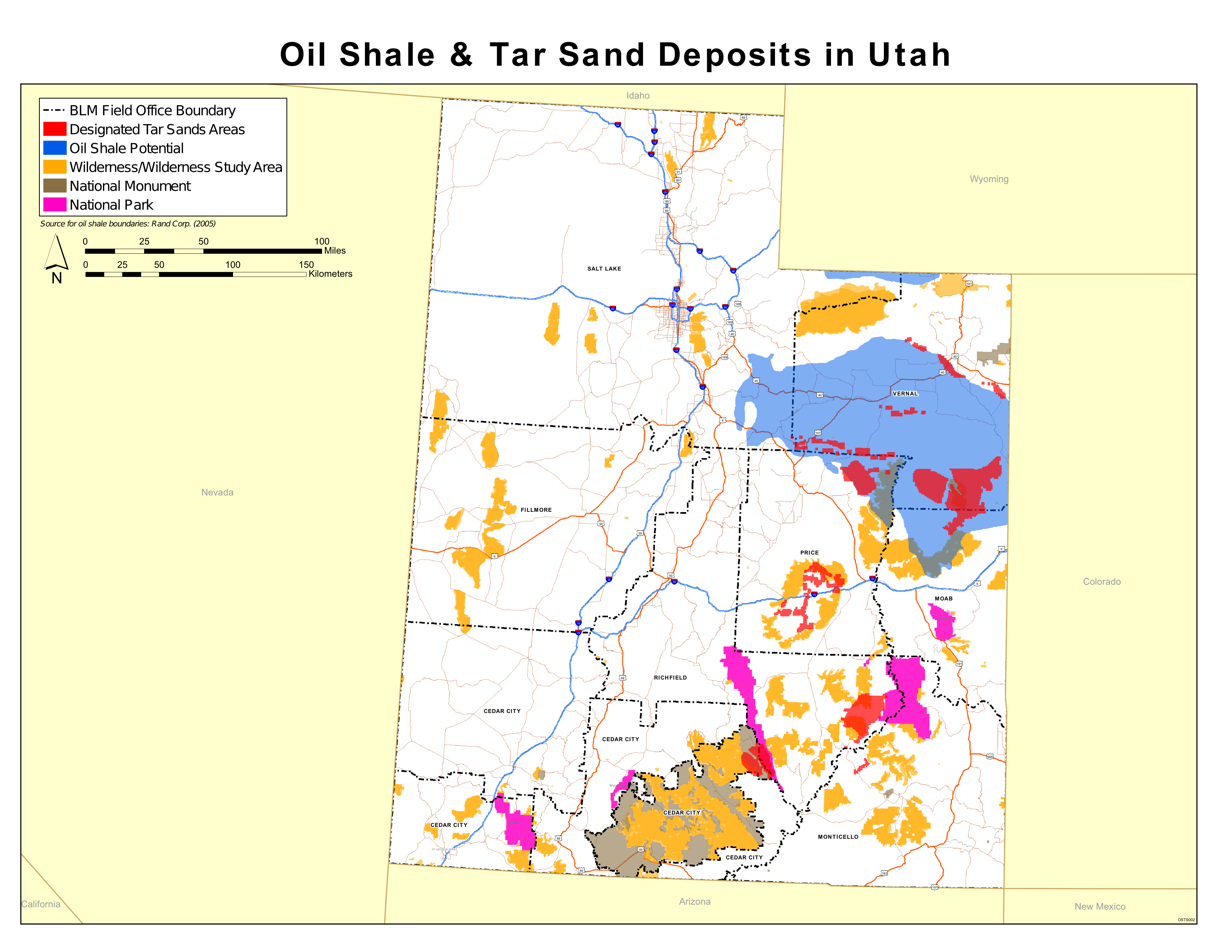
Utah Tar Sands

In the United States a large supply of oil sands are found in Eastern Utah. These deposits of bitumen or heavy crude oil have the ability to generate about 12 to 19 billion barrels from a number of prominent sites.

== History ==
Since the early 1900s the oil sand deposits have been extracted mainly for the use of road pavement. Later, in the 1970s, oil companies began to experiment with the deposits in the hope of using it for their benefit. These experiments ended in the late 1980s when the technologies being used were concluded inefficient and too expensive. Recently, oil companies have again become interested in Utah's oil sands. Now that conventional oil is becoming harder to find, oil sands have become an alternative fuel source.

== Production sites ==
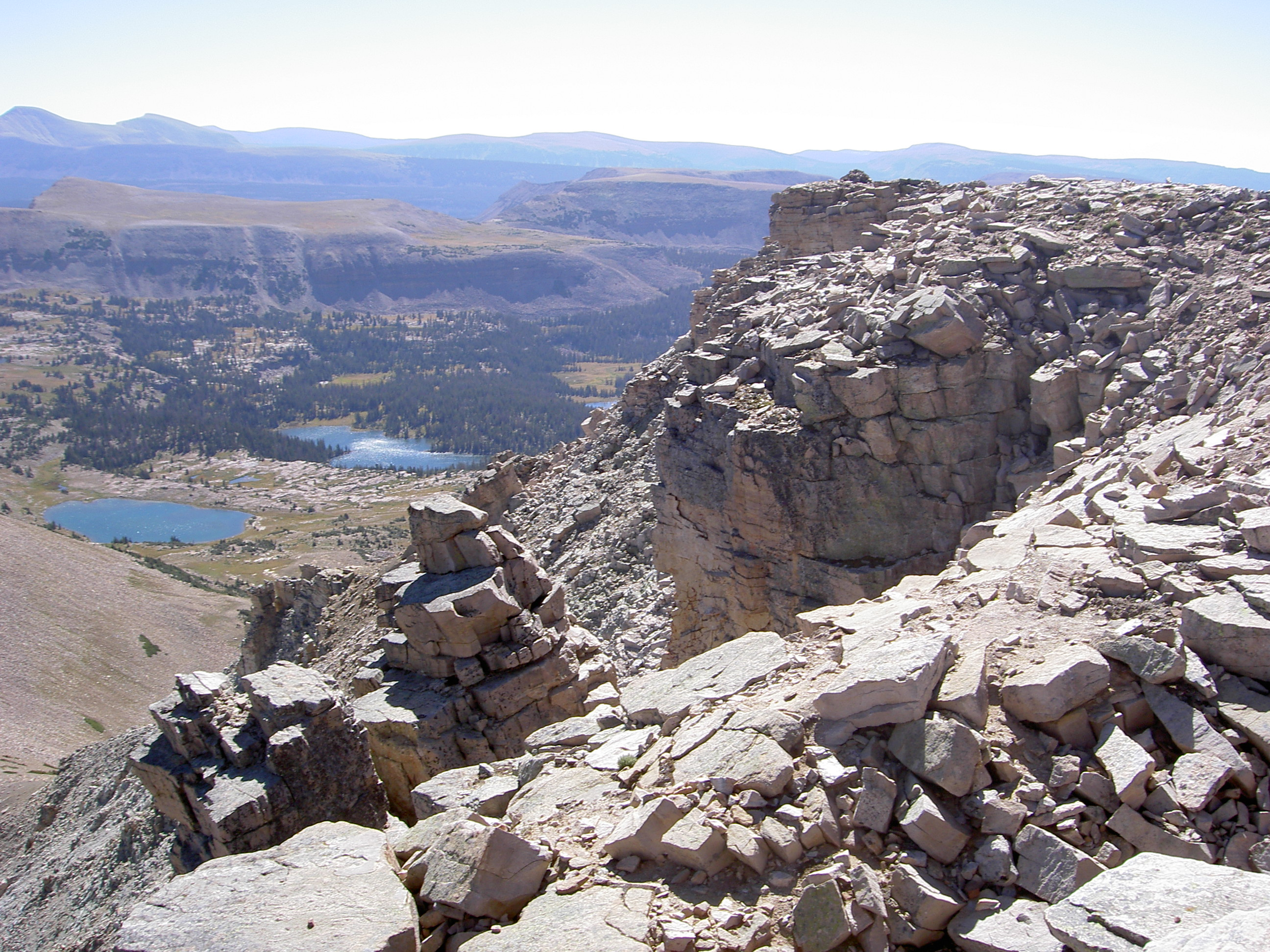
Mountains of the Uintah Basin in Utah

Utah's oil sands are made up of several different deposits all consisting of different amounts of heavy or crude oil. These sites are mostly found on public lands. They are mainly close together and many are found within the Uintah Basin of Utah, which is a section of the Colorado Plateaus province. Some of these sites include Sunnyside, P.R. Spring, Asphalt Ridge, Hill Creek, Circle Ridge, Circle Cliffs, White Rocks, and the Tar Sand Triangle, the highest deposit.

=== Tar Sand Triangle ===
The Tar Sand Triangle is located in Southeastern Utah and covers an area of 148,000 acres (600 km^{2}). It is located between the Dirty Devil and Colorado Rivers in Wayne and Garfield Counties. The Tar Sand Triangle is the largest deposit of oil sands in the United States known today. It contains about 6.3 billion barrels of heavy oil, but is thought to have originally held more. At one point the Tar Sand Triangle could have consisted of 16 billion barrels of heavy oil, almost as much as in Utah today.

== See also ==
- Oil Sands
- Athabasca Oil Sands
- History of the petroleum industry in the United States
- Utah Oil Sands Joint Venture
