= Petrobank Energy and Resources =

Petrobank Energy and Resources Ltd.
- Company type: Public
- Traded as: TSX: PBG
- Industry: Heavy crude oil and natural gas
- Founded: 1983
- Defunct: 2014
- Fate: Merged with Touchstone Exploration Inc.
- Headquarters: Calgary, Alberta, Canada
- Key people: John D. Wright, Chair, President, Chief EXEC; Chris J. Bloomer, Senior Vice President, Chief operating officer, heavy oil
- Revenue: C$1.575331 bil ▲143.2% Ytd sept'10
- Net income: C$151.397 mil ▲72.1% Ytd sept'10
- Total assets: C$7,824.43 mil ▲9.27% qoq $985.518 mil cur▲173%yoy
- Total equity: C$4,805.687 mil ▲2% qoq
- Divisions: PetroBakken Whitesands Insitu Inc
- Website: www.petrobank.com

Petrobank was an oil exploration, development, and production company based in Calgary, Canada. It operates through 4 units/subsidiaries, PetroBakken Energy (58% owned subsidiary) in Canada, Petrominerales Ltd (was 65% owned until December 31, 2010 when both companies parted ways through a reorganization) in Peru and Colombia, HBU (100% owned subsidiary started in 2006) in the heavy crude oil business, and its technology unit Archon Technologies Ltd (THAI and CAPRI). In 1986 the company changed its name from Petrobank Energy Resources Ltd. to Petrobank Energy and Resources Ltd. Though it has a significant resource base its ten patents for heavy oil extracting technology are becoming increasingly valuable to the company. In December 2010 the company received permission from the government of Alberta to produce oil sands bitumen at a new location in Dawson using a technique known as fireflooding, the third Petrobank operation that will use it; the 50% interest in Dawson was acquired in October from Shell Canada.

Revenue was about three times higher (1.1 versus 0.415 billion) and conventional oil production rate twice as much (83.9 versus 42.5 thousand bbl/d) in the first half of 2010 compared to the first half of 2009 (the large increase in total revenue during that period can be credited equally to PetroBakken and Petrominerales, each rising 160-170%). Compared to the last quarter of 2009 the second in 2010 had 40% more revenue, 60% more operating income and a 24.1% rise in asset value compared to only 4.6% for long term debt. PetroBakken operations produced 3.5% more barrels of oil equivalent than Petrominerals in the first half of 2010 compared to 4.6% less a year earlier (by the third quarter PetroBakken 40,095 boe per day (most light oil) . Though not yet a significant producer when compared to PetroBakken and Petrominerales, the HBU heavy oil division has the largest contingent resource base in terms of both net present value and total resources. Every year since 2006 the share of Petrobank's total resources attributable to Petrominerales has grown progressively smaller (mostly because of PetroBakken's more rapid growth (145% growth in net present value in 2009 compared to 69% for Petrominerales).

Its Whitesands operations (subsidiary Whitesands Insitu Inc, HBU heavy oil) may contain 1.8-2.6 billion barrels of oil. Only PetroBakken produces natural gas.

== Acquisitions/Divestments ==
- In May 2009 the parent company reduced its ownership in petrominerales from 76.9% to 66.8%.
- In August 2009 Petrobank purchased tristar oil and gas ltd in a 2.24 billion dollar deal. It then formed PetroBakken by combining its Canadian operations with the tri star oil and gas division.
- In the third quarter of 2010 the company purchased the 50% interest Baytex Energy Ltd.’s and Shell Canada had in Kerrobert and Dawson's heavy oil projects and advanced operations at Kerrobert (phase 1 expansion was started, phase 1 production grew to 380 bpd in November, phase 2 construction began). Petrobank's advanced and patented (holds multiple THAI technology related patents abroad) heavy oil extraction technology gives it a strong interest in enlarging its heavy oil asset base.
- On October 19, 2010 it was reported that Petrobank Energy purchased half of the Dawson heavy oil project from Shell Canada. The transaction (which included a couple other assets) cost C$15 million in net cash.
- As of December 31, 2010 Petrobank's spinoff of its 65% Petrominerales stake will be completed. The new independent company will be called New Petrominerales. Rather than being compensated with cash Petrobank shareholders will each receive 0.614 shares of New Petrominerales for each Petrobank share they own while each shareholder of Petrominerales (before the reorganization) will receive 1 share of the new company.

== THAI technology ==
As compared to Steam assisted gravity drainage Petrobank's Toe to Heel Air Injection process uses no water, has a smaller environmental impact and should hypothetically recover more oil by being more effective in bringing deep heavy oil bitumen deposits to the surface. Most of the estimated 8.9 trillion barrels in bitumen and heavy oil in places like Russia, Venezuela and Colombia can't be recovered using current technology. The technology has either already been applied or is being experimented with at locations in Kerrobert, Sutton, Saskatchewan, White Sands, May River, Dawson, Conklin, Alberta. The process uses air that is injected deep underground to initiate combustion in the reservoir. The heat from the advancing combustion front warms the oil, making it easier to recover up a horizontal production well.

According to engineering firm McDaniel and Associates Consultants Ltd. the THAI technology developed by Petrobank has the potential to exploit 17% more bitumen than SAGD.

THAI is an evolutionary new configuration for in situ combustion that combines a horizontal production well with a vertical air injection well placed at the toe. While most in situ and SAGD processes use a tremendous amount of steam to heat the entire well, THAI uses a relatively insignificant amount to heat the bitumen around the well bore. After the area is at optimal temperature, air is then injected into the well. As the air reaches the heated source, it initiates a combustion reaction. More air is then injected into the reservoir and the vertical combustion front progresses along the horizontal well pushing all the oil in advance of itself. As the temperature increases inside of the well, the heavy oil is partially upgraded by the cracking of the large hydrocarbon chain. This makes the oil less viscous and allows for a more efficient flow towards the surface (Petrobank Energy and Resources 2009).

== Operations ==
- PetroBakken (operates Bakken and Cardium light oil developments)
  - Montney and the Horn River Basin, B.C. - Shale gas
  - Southeast Saskatchewan - Light crude oil
- HBU heavy oil
  - Dawson, Alberta - Oil sands bitumen
- Petrominerales (total proved reserves to 36.0 and 53.1 million barrels of oil, 2P (Proved + Probable) reserves are 2.7 times smaller than Petrobakken)

Petrominerales became independent of Petrobank on December 31, 2010

  - Colombia (15 exploration blocks covering 2 million acres)
    - Corcel and Guatiquia deep in the Llanos Basin - oil
    - Llanos Basin plains region - oil
    - Southern and eastern edges of the Llanos Basin heavy oil belt - heavy oil
    - Neiva in cooperation with Ecopetrol - Magdalena Valley Basin
    - Orito - largest oil discovery in the Putumayo basin
  - Peru (5 exploration blocks with a gross acreage of 9.5 million, 5.4 million net)
    - Ucayali Basin - last drill in 1988 was shut down because of security concerns.
    - Titicaca Basin
