= Marie Bay =

Bay in the Northwest Territories, Canada

- Location within Northwest Territories
- Location: Melville Island
- Coordinates: 76°13′03″N 115°20′10″W
- Basin countries: Canada
- Settlements: Uninhabited

Marie Bay is a fjord on the Northwest tip of Melville Island. Marie Bay lies on the part of Melville Island that is in the Northwest Territories while the eastern part of the island is in Nunavut.

Oil sands deposits were found in the Marie Bay region and are estimated to hold 100 to 250 million barrels of oil.
