= Ranger Oil Corporation =

American oil and gas company

Ranger Oil Corporation (formerly Penn Virginia Corporation) is an independent oil and gas company engaged in the exploration, development and production of oil, NGLs and natural gas in various domestic onshore regions of the United States, with a primary focus in the Eagle Ford Shale in South Texas. Penn Virginia recently relocated its corporate headquarters from Radnor, Pennsylvania to Houston, Texas and continues district operations facilities at various locations in Texas.

In January 2016, Penn Virginia announced it had received notification from the New York Stock Exchange (NYSE) that the NYSE had determined to commence proceedings to delist the Company's common stock and that the Company will begin trading on the OTC Pink. In May 2016, Penn Virginia announced that it had filed voluntary petitions for relief under chapter 11 of the U.S. Bankruptcy Code.

== History ==
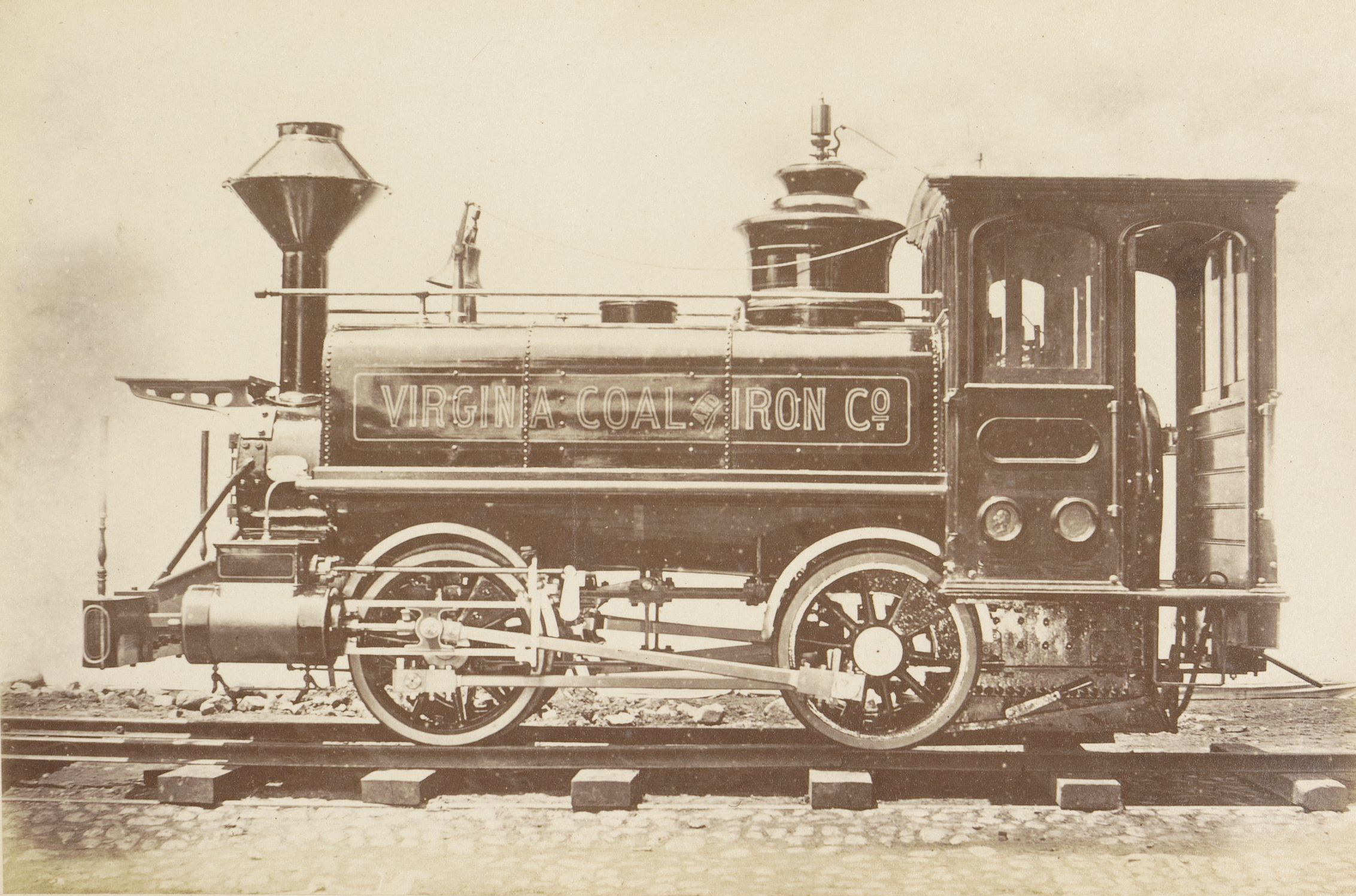
Steam locomotive of the Virginia Coal & Iron Co.

Penn Virginia's history dates to the Virginia Coal & Iron Co. (VC&I) founded in 1882 by Philadelphia, Pennsylvania businessman John Leisenring, Jr., whose grandfather had settled in the anthracite coal-rich Lehigh Valley in 1748. Leisenring's father ran a hotel in Mauch Chunk which was the headquarters of the Lehigh Coal and Navigation Company. Leisenring engaged in numerous coal partnerships but his biggest success was acquiring rights to a coal vein on 67,000 acres (270 km^{2}) in southwest Virginia, close to the Kentucky and Tennessee border, that had once been partially owned by Confederate general John D. Imboden who had sold it to the Tinsalia Coal & Iron Co. which also bought a Bristol Coal and Iron Company Narrow Gauge Railway to bring it to market. In 1902 the Stonega Coke & Coal Co. was formed to be the company's operational arm. In 1917 it acquired a major stake in Westmoreland Coal.

In 1967 it changed its name to Penn Virginia Corporation. After going through a period of diversification it began acquiring oil and gas companies in the 1980s. Penn Virginia was listed on the New York Stock Exchange in 1997. In 2001 it began decentralizing again spinning off its coal and pipeline operations into Penn Virginia Resources. In 2006 it spun off its ownership of Penn Virginia Resources into a third publicly traded company Penn Virginia GP Holdings, L.P. and in 2010 completed divestiture of Penn Virginia GP Holdings, L.P. In 2011, Penn Virginia Resources and Penn Virginia GP Holdings merged and were re-branded as PVR Partners, L.P. before merging with Regency Energy Partners, L.P. in 2014 (which was subsequently acquired by Energy Transfer Partners in 2015).

Penn Virginia acquired on 12 July 2021 Lonestar Resources an oil and natural gas company based in Fort Worth, Texas for $370 million and Penn Virginia will be renamed Ranger Oil Corporation.

In June 2023, Baytex Energy completed their acquisition of Ranger Oil.
