= Melville Island oil sands =

Deposit of oil sands on Melville Island, Canada

- Map showing location of Melville Island in Canada.
- Country: Canada
- Region: Nunavut
- Offshore/onshore: Onshore, unconventional

The Melville Island oil sands are a large deposit of oil sands (sometimes referred to as tar sands) on Melville Island in the Canadian Arctic Archipelago.

Exploration for petroleum deposits in the Canadian Arctic Archipelago began, on Melville Island, in 1961. Oil sands deposits were found in the Marie Bay region in 1962, and other locations that are part of the Bjorne Formation. The landscape has been impacted by this petroleum exploration with long-term effects, including degradation of permafrost and changes to vegetation.

== See also ==
- Athabasca oil sands
- Peace River oil sands
- Cold Lake oil sands
- Wabasca oil sands
