= Baytex Energy =

Canadian energy company

Baytex Energy Corp.
- Type: Public
- Traded as: TSX: BTE; NYSE: BTE
- Industry: Petroleum industry
- Founded: 1993; 33 years ago
- Headquarters: Calgary, Canada
- Key people: Mark Bly (chairman); Chad Lundberg (president and CEO)
- Products: Heavy crude oil, Light crude oil, Natural Gas
- Revenue: C$852.74 (2010)▲24%
- Net income: C$177.63 million (2010)▲103%
- Total assets: C$2.047 billion dec 2010
- Total equity: C$1.029 billion dec 2010
- Divisions: 5
- Website: baytexenergy.com

Baytex Energy Corp. is an energy company based in Calgary, Alberta. The company is engaged in the acquisition, development and production of crude oil and natural gas in the Western Canadian Sedimentary Basin and in the Eagle Ford in the United States. Baytex's common shares trade on the Toronto Stock Exchange and on the New York Stock Exchange under the symbol BTE.

== History ==
Early on (1993–2000) the company was more focused on developing light oil and natural gas containing properties in North and SE Alberta. In Jan 19, 2006, Baytex Energy Trust announced that the New York Stock Exchange had cleared Baytex to file an Original Listing Application to list its trust units on the NYSE. The company began trading on the NYSE on March 27.

In April 2008 it completed a $181 million takeover of Burmis Energy Inc, a Calgary-based oil and natural gas producer (72% of production was natural gas) that was nine times smaller than Baytex at the time. The deal gave Baytex control of the Seal heavy oil property in Alberta and increased daily production by 3,650 boe.

Many key heavy oil and natural gas assets were purchased from True Energy Trust in the summer of 2009 for US$79.9 million (when the US:Cdn exchange rate was 1:1.164). The deal which included properties near Lloydminster and Kerrobert, Saskatchewan (heavy oil) and also central Alberta (natural gas) increased production and cash flow by 7% and 6% respectively.

In October 2010 it sold half of the interest it had in the Kerrobert heavy oil properties to Petrobank Energy and Resources (including another asset acquired in Dawson the transaction cost Petrobank $15 million, Petrobank's THAI and CAPRI technology can help Baytex exploit more of the resource).

In February 2011 it completed a $156.5 million deal with a private company for heavy oil assets in Saskatchewan (near Seal Lake and Lloydminster). The acquisition added over 10 million boe of proved and probable reserves and raised company production by about 5%.

In 2011 and 2016, respectively, Baytex acquired "heavy oil assets located in the Reno and Seal areas of its northern Alberta Peace River area."

In June 2014 Baytex acquired Aurora Oil & Gas Limited, which led to its significant new position in the EagleFord shale oil play in Texas.

In 2014 Baytex 52-week high was $49.88 and its 52-week low was $14.56.

For fiscal 2016 total production was 69,300 US bbl/d8,260 m^{3}/d, flat to the year before. Baytex's portfolio is 79% oil and liquids with the remaining 21% natural gas. Light and medium oil (oil with an API gravity over 22.3 degrees) makes up a growing part of its reserve base.

In June 2018, Baytex announced an offer to buy Raging River Exploration Inc., another Canadian oil and gas firm, for C$2.8 billion. The all-stock deal was poorly received by markets and analysts, with both companys' share prices falling.

On March 18, 2020, Baytex announces a 50% reduction to its 2020 capital budget to a range of $260 to $290 million, from the original range of $500 to $575 million. Ed LaFehr, the President and Chief Executive Officer of the company commented that they are "facing unprecedented challenge due to the significant degradation and volatility in global crude oil prices."

On February 20, 2023, Baytex announced that it had agreed to acquire Ranger Oil Corporation. On June 20, 2023, Baytex announced the closing of the merger.

== Sustainability ==
In September 2019, Baytex published a greenhouse gas ("GHG") emissions reduction target with an objective of reducing corporate emission intensity by 30% by 2021, relative to a 2018 baseline

== Operations ==
Baytex's operations are organized into five main operating areas: Peace River, Lloydminster, Viking, Duvernay and the Eagle Ford. Approximately 82% of its production and reserves are derived from crude oil and liquids. The Eagle Ford in Texas represents approximately 46% of production.

- Eagle Ford - the Eagle Ford assets are located in the core of the liquids-rich Eagle Ford shale in South Texas and include non-operated working interests in approximately 78,205 (19,851 net) acres. The lands consist of four areas of mutual interest (Sugarloaf, Longhorn, Ipanema and Excelsior) with an average working interest of approximately 25%. In 2019, production in the Eagle Ford averaged 39,055 boe/d.
- Viking - the Viking assets are located in the greater Dodsland area in southwest Saskatchewan and in the Esther area of southeastern Alberta. These assets were acquired through a business combination with Raging River and produce light oil from the Viking formation. In 2019, the Viking assets produced 22,546 boe/d.
- Heavy Oil – Baytex's heavy oil assets are located at Peace River in northwest Alberta and Lloydminster in Alberta and Saskatchewan. In Peace River, Baytex produces heavy oil from the Bluesky formation. In Lloydminster, operations include primary and thermal production. In 2019, the heavy oil assets produced 29,377 boe/d.
- Duvernay - as a result of the merger with Raging River, Baytex acquired a land position in the emerging Pembina Area Duvernay shale in central Alberta. In 2019, the Duvernay assets produced 1,688 boe/d.
