= Cold Lake oil sands =

Large deposit of petroleum in Alberta, Canada

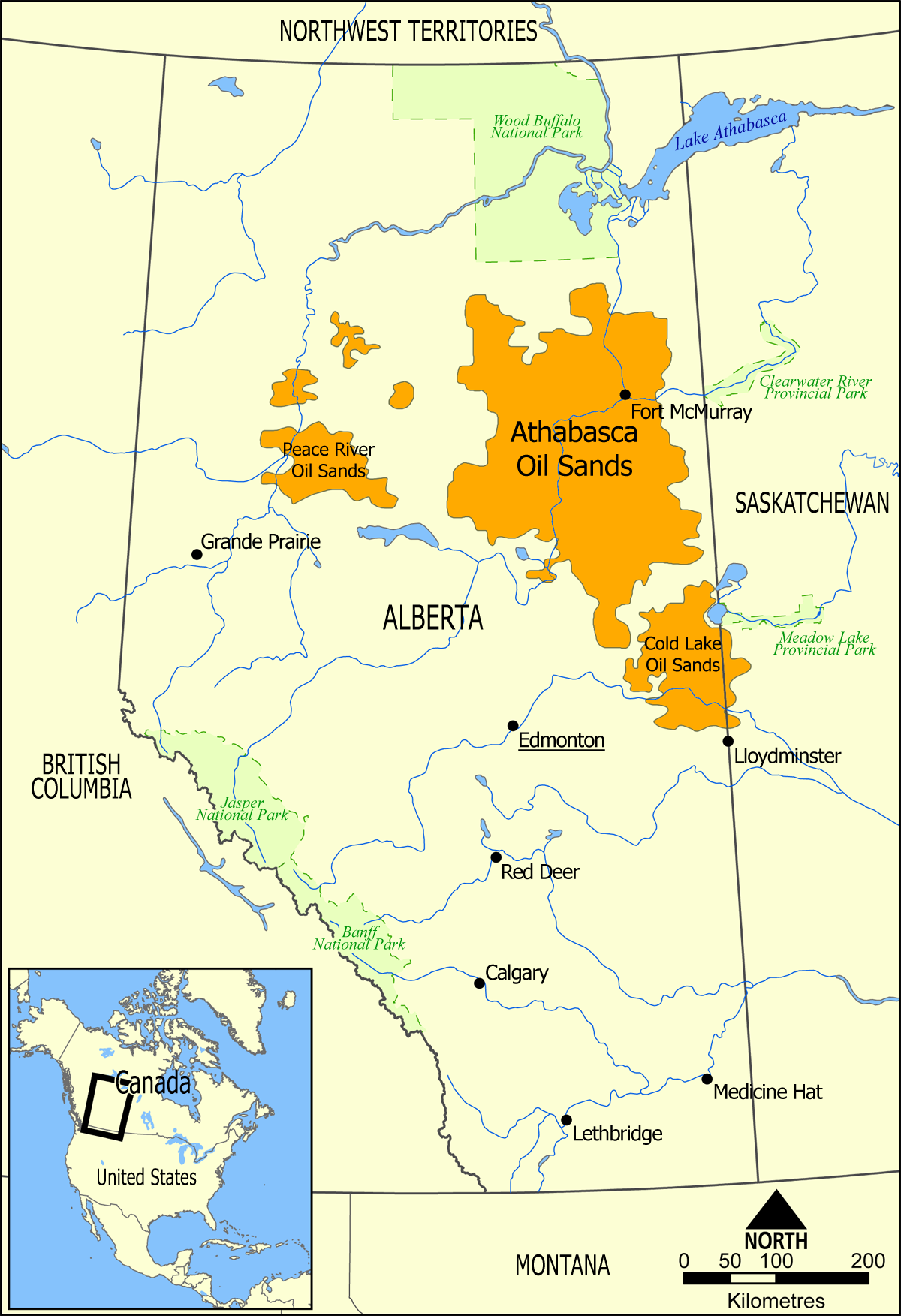
- The Cold Lake oil sands deposit is one of the largest petroleum deposits in Alberta, located south of the Athabasca oil sands and directly east of the provincial capital, Edmonton.
- Country: Canada
- Region: Alberta and Saskatchewan
- Offshore/onshore: Onshore, unconventional

The Cold Lake oil sands are a large deposit of oil sands located near Cold Lake, Alberta. Cold Lake is east of Alberta's capital, Edmonton, near Alberta's border with Saskatchewan, and a small portion of the Cold Lake field lies in Saskatchewan.

In 1980, a plant in Cold Lake was one of just two oil sands plants under construction in Alberta.Although not developed as quickly and extensively as originally envisioned, an Imperial Oil plant in Cold Lake became the largest in situ oil sands project constructed in Alberta during the 1980s. By 1991, its daily oil production was 90,000 barrels.

Some of the oil sands in the Cold Lake deposit have a low enough density that they can be extracted through drilling, as opposed to mining.

== See also ==
- Athabasca oil sands
- Peace River oil sands
- Melville Island oil sands
- Wabasco oil sands
- List of articles about Canadian oil sands
