= Project Oilsand =

1958 proposal to exploit oil sands in Alberta

Project Oilsand, also known as Project Oilsands, and originally known as Project Cauldron, was a 1958 proposal to exploit the Athabasca Oil Sands in Alberta via the underground detonation of up to 100 nuclear explosives; hypothetically, the heat and pressure created by an underground detonation would boil the bitumen deposits, reducing their viscosity to the point that standard oilfield techniques could be used.

The proposal was devised by geologist Manley L. Natland at Los Angeles–based Richfield Oil Corporation. The project was conceived of as part of Operation Plowshare, a United States project to harness the nuclear explosions for peaceful applications.

== History ==
The use of nuclear weapons for oil and gas extraction was first theorized by American geologist Manley L. Natland, of the Richfield Oil Company in 1956. Natland was working on location in the southern desert of Saudi Arabia and contemplated using the immense heat of a nuclear explosion while watching the sun set. Natland posited that drilling a deep borehole and detonating a nuclear weapon would result in an immense release of heat and energy which would crush and melt surrounding rock, separate oil from sand, and create an underground cavity where the oil would pool for conventional extraction. This method could be effective for the oil reserves of the McMurray Formation, which could not be viably exploited with the technology of the time as it buried deep underground and highly viscous.

Natland was dispatched by Richfield to Alberta's Athabasca oil sands in 1957 to scout possible drilling locations, which he found at the Pony Creek site, 8.7 km northwest from the nearest settlement of Chard. Pony Creek was chosen for six reasons: the absence of people and infrastructure, absence of developed oil fields which could be affected by the detonation, the Crown rights to the surface and mineral rights, significant estimated amount of oil to make the experiment viable, the depth of the oil sands deposit could contain the detonation, and the oil quality was high enough to be processed. Richfield entered into an exploration lease on Crown land in the area with Imperial Oil and City Service Athabasca Incorporated for 2 million acres (8,100 km^{2}) of land and mineral rights.

Prospects for Natland's hypothesis were boosted by two recent experiments, the Rainier Shot experiment in 1957 where a 1.7 kt underground nuclear test resulted in no fission products vented into the atmosphere, and the conventional explosion at Ripple Rock to remove an underwater mountain in April 1958. With the knowledge of the successful tests, Richfield executives met with United States Atomic Energy Commission (AEC) chairman Willard Libby and members of the Lawrence Livermore National Laboratory including proponent of non-military use of nuclear weapons Edward Teller, on May 9, 1958, to discuss the oilsands proposal and begin the process of procuring a nuclear weapon. Richmond received support and interest from the meeting, as the American government saw the value of a new source of strategic oil reserves.

However, some experts had doubts. In 1959, oil sands pioneer Robert Fitzsimmons of the International Bitumen Company wrote a letter to the Edmonton Journal, saying "While the writer does not know anything about nuclear energy and is therefore not qualified to make any definite statement as to it's [sic] results he does know something about the effect dry heat has on those sands and ventures a guess that if it does not turn the whole deposit into a burning inferno it is almost sure to fuse it into a solid mass of semi glass or coke."

=== Alberta reaction ===
On June 5, 1958 (one month after the Richfield Oil Corporation's meeting with the Atomic Energy Commission), Natland and executives from Richfield met with Hubert H. Somerville, Alberta's deputy minister of mines and minerals. Somerville was supportive of the idea, and relayed it to Premier Ernest Manning who was interested in exploring the concept. Richfield executives discussed their proposal with a group of federal regulators, including John Carvey and Alexander Ignatieff from the Mines Branch of the federal Department of Energy, Mines and Resources, as well as Donald Watson of Atomic Energy of Canada Limited, and Alexander Longair of the Defence Research Board.

An investigative committee was formed with the support of Alberta's Social Credit government. One of the committee's early recommendations was that, in order to minimize public fears, a "less effervescent name" should be used; Project Cauldron was subsequently renamed Project Oilsand.

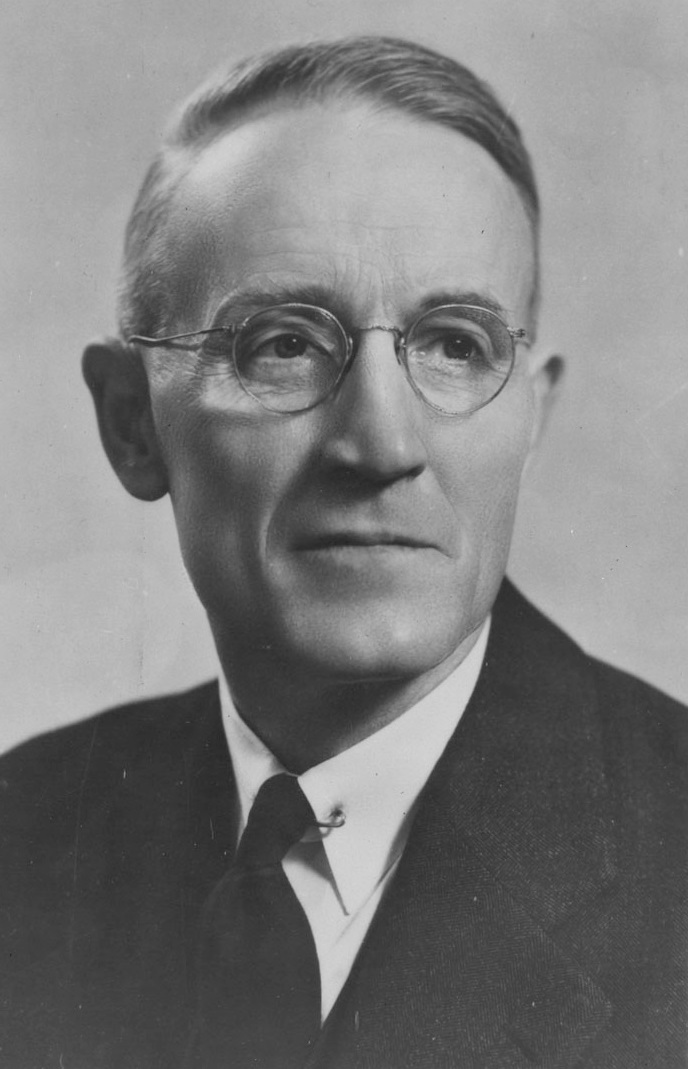
Secretary of State for External Affairs Howard Charles Green opposed Project Oilsands.

In April 1959, the Federal Mines Department approved Project Oilsand. Pony Creek, Alberta (103 kilometres [64 miles] from Fort McMurray) was selected as a test site. However, between the Canadian government's increasingly anti-proliferation stance and concerns that Project Oilsands would increase the risk of Soviet espionage, the project was put on hiatus. In April 1962, Canadian Secretary of State for External Affairs Howard Charles Green said "Canada is opposed to nuclear tests, period." Project Oilsand was subsequently cancelled.

These changes in Canadian public opinion are regarded by historian Michael Payne to be due to the shift in public perception of nuclear explosives following the 1962 Cuban Missile Crisis. Prime Minister John Diefenbaker told Parliament that the decision to detonate an atomic bomb on or under Canadian soil would be made by Canada, not the United States, and ordered that Project Cauldron/Oilsands be placed on permanent hold, citing the risk of upsetting the Soviet Union during nuclear disarmament negotiations being conducted in Geneva.

Ultimately, conventional fracking techniques proved cheaper than those proposed by Project Oilsands. The risk engendered by nuclear contamination was also significant.

== Method ==
=== Theoretical background ===
The general means by which the plan was to work was discussed in the October 1976 Bulletin of the Atomic Scientists issue. A patent was granted for the process that was intended: The Process for Stimulating Petroliferous Subterranean Formations with Contained Nuclear Explosions by Bray, Knutson, and Coffer which was first submitted in 1964. With the nuclear detonation option being considered to have served as a forerunner to some of the nascent conventional ideas that are presently in use and proposed to extract oil from the Alberta regions Athabasca oil sands.

Previous underground nuclear weapon tests by the AEC had provided scientific evidence on the effect on rock surrounding the blast. Milliseconds following the detonation of the weapon the temperature of the surrounding area would rise exponentially to millions of degrees, vaporizing and melting any surrounded rock which would expand to create an underground cavity lined with molten rock. The shockwave from the detonation would progress beyond the cavity fracturing rock outside of the cavity, eventually causing liquid parts to drip down below until the cavity pressure and temperature drops resulting in the rock solidifying. The solidified cavity would contain any radioactive gasses and as pressure drops the overburden collapses under the weight, burying most of the radioactive materials at the bottom of the cavity.

=== Project Oilsand methods ===
For Project Oilsand, the proposed plan had a 9 kt (38 TJ) nuclear device buried 1,250 feet (380 m) underground in the Beaverhill Lake Group, 20 feet (6.1 m) below the base of the McMurray Formation above. Natland and the AEC believed a 9 kt nuclear device was powerful enough to facilitate a meaningful test and be completely contained at the proposed depth with a "generous safety factor" to ensure radioactive debris could not escape. The decision to drill to 1,250 feet was based on the safe containment formula developed after the Rainier test where depth in feet is equal to 450 times the energy in kilotons to the power of one-third $(\{D\} _ \mathrm{ft} = 450 \{W\} _ \mathrm{kt} ^ {1 / 3}).$ The Lawrence Livermore National Laboratory considered the formula to be "extremely conservative" due to the resilient overlying Clearwater shale bed, and scientists believed a 30–40 kt (130–170 TJ) nuclear device could be detonated without causing a disruption to the surface, and theorized up to 100 kt (420 TJ) may have been used safely.

Based on research by the Lawrence Livermore National Laboratory, the cavity created by the detonation was estimated to be approximately 230 feet (70 m) in diameter. The cavity was expected to collapse anywhere between a few seconds and few minutes following the detonation, and "several million" cubic feet of oil sand would have fallen into the cavity, the oil separated by the intense heat, allowing recovery through conventional drilling. Natland also believed that the pressure from the resulting shockwave was sufficient to crack the oil, increasing the total recoverable beyond the thermal effects.

== See also ==
- Project Plowshare
- Nuclear Explosions for the National Economy
