= Oil sands =

Type of unconventional oil deposit

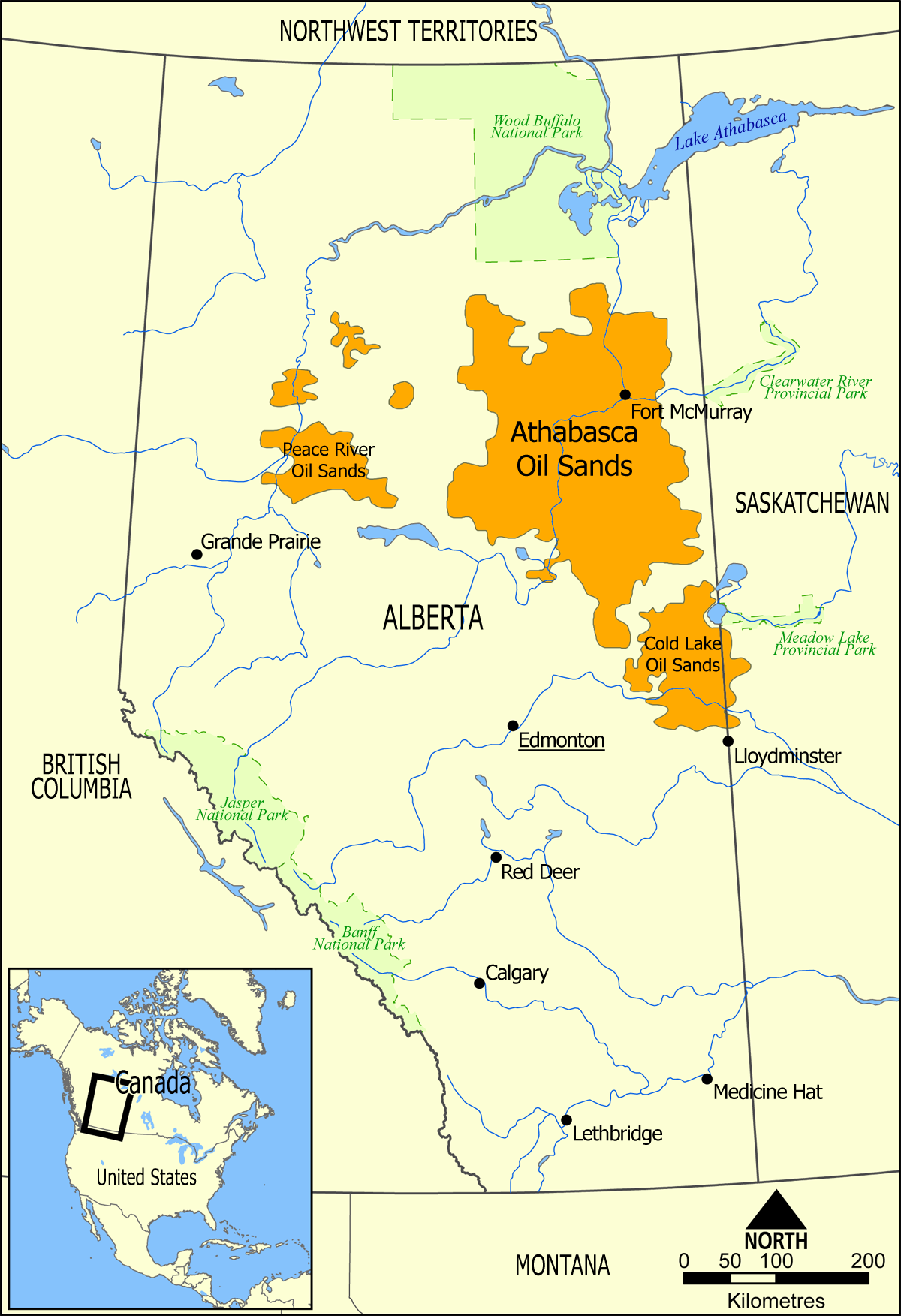
The Athabasca oil sands in Alberta, Canada, are a very large source of bitumen, which can be upgraded to synthetic crude heavy oil, Western Canadian Select (WCS)

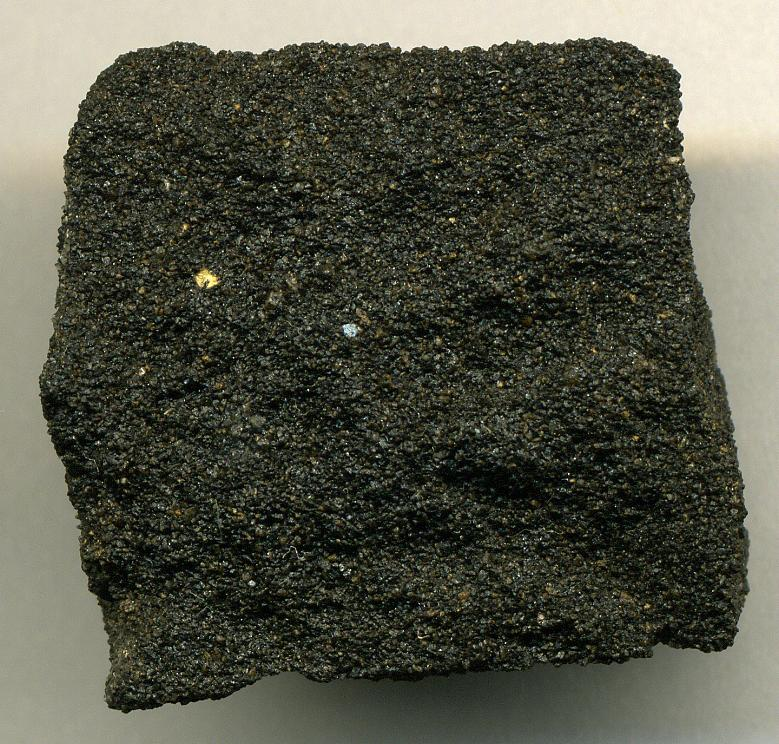
Tar sandstone from California, United States

Oil sands (Note: Also known as tar sands, crude bitumen, or bituminous sands.) are a type of unconventional petroleum deposit. They are either loose sands, or partially consolidated sandstone containing a naturally occurring mixture of sand, clay, and water, soaked with bitumen (a dense and extremely viscous form of petroleum).

Significant bitumen deposits are reported in Canada, Kazakhstan, Russia, and Venezuela. The estimated worldwide deposits of oil are more than 2 trillion barrels (320 billion cubic metres). Proven reserves of bitumen contain approximately 100 billion barrels, and total natural bitumen reserves are estimated at 249.67 Gbbl (39.694×10^{9} m^{3}) worldwide, of which 176.8 Gbbl (28.11×10^{9} m^{3}), or 70.8%, are in Alberta, Canada.

Crude bitumen is a thick, sticky form of crude oil, and is so viscous that it will not flow unless heated or diluted with lighter hydrocarbons such as light crude oil or natural-gas condensate. At room temperature, it is much like cold molasses. The Orinoco Belt in Venezuela is sometimes described as oil sands, but these deposits are non-bituminous, falling instead into the category of heavy or extra-heavy oil due to their lower viscosity. Natural bitumen and extra-heavy oil differ in the degree by which they have been degraded from the original conventional oils by bacteria.

The 1973 and 1979 oil price increases, the development of improved extraction technology, and generous subsidies, enabled profitable extraction and processing of the oil sands. Together with other so-called unconventional oil extraction practices, oil sands are implicated in the unburnable carbon debate but also contribute to energy security and counteract the international price cartel OPEC. According to the Oil Climate Index, carbon emissions from oil-sand crude are 31% higher than from conventional oil. In Canada, oil sands production in general, and in-situ extraction, in particular, are the largest contributors to the increase in the nation's greenhouse gas emissions from 2005 to 2017, according to Natural Resources Canada (NRCan).

== History ==
The use of bituminous deposits and seeps dates back to Paleolithic times. The earliest known use of bitumen was by Neanderthals, some 40,000 years ago. Bitumen has been found adhering to stone tools used by Neanderthals at sites in Syria. After the arrival of Homo sapiens, humans used bitumen for construction of buildings and waterproofing of reed boats, among other uses. In ancient Egypt, the use of bitumen was important in preparing mummies.

In ancient times, bitumen was primarily a Mesopotamian commodity used by the Sumerians and Babylonians, although it was also found in the Levant and Persia. The area along the Tigris and Euphrates rivers was littered with hundreds of pure bitumen seepages. The Mesopotamians used the bitumen for waterproofing boats and buildings. In Europe, they were extensively mined near the French city of Pechelbronn, where the vapour separation process was in use in 1742.

In Canada, the First Nation peoples had used bitumen from seeps along the Athabasca and Clearwater Rivers to waterproof their birch bark canoes from early prehistoric times. The Canadian oil sands first became known to Europeans in 1719 when a Cree person named Wa-Pa-Su brought a sample to Hudson's Bay Company fur trader Henry Kelsey, who commented on it in his journals. Fur trader Peter Pond paddled down the Clearwater River to Athabasca in 1778, saw the deposits and wrote of "springs of bitumen that flow along the ground". In 1787, fur trader and explorer Alexander MacKenzie on his way to the Arctic Ocean saw the Athabasca oil sands, and commented, "At about 24 miles from the fork (of the Athabasca and Clearwater Rivers) are some bituminous fountains into which a pole of 20 feet long may be inserted without the least resistance."

== Cost of oil sands petroleum-mining operations ==
In their May 2019 comparison of the "cost of supply curve update" in which the Norway-based Rystad Energy—an "independent energy research and consultancy"—ranked the "worlds total recoverable liquid resources by their breakeven price", Rystad reported that the average breakeven price for oil from the oil sands was US$83 in 2019, making it the most expensive to produce, compared to all other "significant oil producing regions" in the world. (Note: The "Middle East onshore market" was the "cheapest source of new oil volumes globally" with the "North American tight oil"—which includes onshore shale oil in the United States—in second place.The breakeven price for North American shale oil was US$68 a barrel in 2015, making it one of the most expensive to produce. By 2019, the "average Brent breakeven price for tight oil was about US$46 per barrel. The breakeven price of oil from Saudi Arabia and other Middle Eastern countries was US$42, in comparison.) The International Energy Agency made similar comparisons.

The price per barrel of heavier, sour crude oils lacking in tidewater access—such as Western Canadian Select (WCS) from the Athabaska oil sands, are priced at a differential to the lighter, sweeter oil—such as West Texas Intermediate (WTI). The price is based on its grade—determined by factors such as its specific gravity or API and its sulfur content—and its location—for example, its proximity to tidewater and/or refineries.

Because the cost of production is so much higher at oil sands petroleum-mining operations, the breakeven point is much higher than for sweeter lighter oils like that produced by Saudi Arabia, Iran, Iraq, and the United States. Oil sands productions expand and prosper as the global price of oil increased to peak highs because of the Arab oil embargo of 1973, the 1979 Iranian Revolution, the 1990 Persian Gulf crisis and war, the 11 September 2001 attacks, and the 2003 invasion of Iraq. The boom periods were followed by the bust, as the global price of oil dropped during the 1980s and again in the 1990s, during a period of global recessions, and again in 2003.

== Nomenclature ==
The name tar sands was applied to bituminous sands in the late 19th and early 20th century. People who saw the bituminous sands during this period were familiar with the large amounts of tar residue produced in urban areas as a by-product of the manufacture of coal gas for urban heating and lighting. The word "tar" to describe these natural bitumen deposits is really a misnomer, since, chemically speaking, tar is a human-made substance produced by the destructive distillation of organic material, usually coal.

Since then, coal gas has almost completely been replaced by natural gas as a fuel, and coal tar as a material for paving roads has been replaced by the petroleum product asphalt. Naturally occurring bitumen is chemically more similar to asphalt than to coal tar, and the term oil sands (or oilsands) is more commonly used by industry in the producing areas than tar sands because synthetic oil is manufactured from the bitumen, and due to the feeling that the terminology of tar sands is less politically acceptable to the public. Oil sands are now an alternative to conventional crude oil.

== Geology ==
The world's largest deposits of oil sands are in Venezuela and Canada. The geology of the deposits in the two countries is generally rather similar. They are vast heavy oil, extra-heavy oil, and/or bitumen deposits with oil heavier than 20°API, found largely in unconsolidated sandstones with similar properties. "Unconsolidated" in this context means that the sands have high porosity, no significant cohesion, and a tensile strength close to zero. The sands are saturated with oil which has prevented them from consolidating into hard sandstone.

=== Size of resources ===
The magnitude of the resources in the two countries is on the order of 3.5 to 4 trillion barrels (550 to 650 billion cubic metres) of original oil in place (OOIP). Oil in place is not necessarily oil reserves, and the amount that can be produced depends on technological evolution. Rapid technological developments in Canada in the 1985–2000 period resulted in techniques such as steam-assisted gravity drainage (SAGD) that can recover a much greater percentage of the OOIP than conventional methods. The Alberta government estimates that with current technology, 10% of its bitumen and heavy oil can be recovered, which would give it about 200 billion barrels (32 billion m^{3}) of recoverable oil reserves. Venezuela estimates its recoverable oil at 267 billion barrels (42 billion m^{3}). This places Canada and Venezuela in the same league as Saudi Arabia, having the three largest oil reserves in the world.

=== Major deposits ===
There are numerous deposits of oil sands in the world, but the biggest and most important are in Canada and Venezuela, with lesser deposits in Kazakhstan and Russia. The total volume of non-conventional oil in the oil sands of these countries exceeds the reserves of conventional oil in all other countries combined. Vast deposits of bitumen—over 350 billion cubic metres (2.2 trillion barrels) of oil in place—exist in the Canadian provinces of Alberta and Saskatchewan. If 30% of this oil could be extracted, it could supply the entire needs of North America for over 100 years at 2002 consumption levels. These deposits represent plentiful oil, but not cheap oil. They require advanced technology to extract the oil and transport it to oil refineries.

==== Canada ====
The oil sands of the Western Canadian Sedimentary Basin (WCSB) are a result of the formation of the Canadian Rocky Mountains by the Pacific Plate overthrusting the North American Plate as it pushed in from the west, carrying the formerly large island chains which now compose most of British Columbia. The collision compressed the Alberta plains and raised the Rockies above the plains, forming mountain ranges. This mountain building process buried the sedimentary rock layers which underlie most of Alberta to a great depth, creating high subsurface temperatures, and producing a giant pressure cooker effect that converted the kerogen in the deeply buried organic-rich shales to light oil and natural gas. These source rocks were similar to the American so-called oil shales, except the latter have never been buried deep enough to convert the kerogen in them into liquid oil.

This overthrusting also tilted the pre-Cretaceous sedimentary rock formations underlying most of the sub-surface of Alberta, depressing the rock formations in southwest Alberta up to 8 km (5 miles) deep near the Rockies, but to zero depth in the northeast, where they pinched out against the igneous rocks of the Canadian Shield, which outcrop on the surface. This tilting is not apparent on the surface because the resulting trench has been filled in by eroded material from the mountains. The light oil migrated up-dip through hydro-dynamic transport from the Rockies in the southwest toward the Canadian Shield in the northeast following a complex pre-Cretaceous unconformity that exists in the formations under Alberta. The total distance of oil migration southwest to northeast was about 500 to 700 km (300 to 400 miles). At the shallow depths of sedimentary formations in the northeast, massive microbial biodegradation as the oil approached the surface caused the oil to become highly viscous and immobile. Almost all of the remaining oil is found in the far north of Alberta, in Middle Cretaceous (115 million-year old) sand-silt-shale deposits overlain by thick shales, although large amounts of heavy oil lighter than bitumen are found in the Heavy Oil Belt along the Alberta-Saskatchewan border, extending into Saskatchewan and approaching the Montana border. Note that, although adjacent to Alberta, Saskatchewan has no massive deposits of bitumen, only large reservoirs of heavy oil >10°API.

Most of the Canadian oil sands are in three major deposits in northern Alberta. They are the Athabasca-Wabiskaw oil sands of north northeastern Alberta, the Cold Lake deposits of east northeastern Alberta, and the Peace River deposits of northwestern Alberta. Between them, they cover over 140,000 square kilometres (54,000 sq mi)—an area larger than England—and contain approximately 1.75 Tbbl (280×10^{9} m^{3}) of crude bitumen in them. About 10% of the oil in place, or 173 Gbbl (27.5×10^{9} m^{3}), is estimated by the government of Alberta to be recoverable at current prices, using current technology, which amounts to 97% of Canadian oil reserves and 75% of total North American petroleum reserves. Although the Athabasca deposit is the only one in the world which has areas shallow enough to mine from the surface, all three Alberta areas are suitable for production using in-situ methods, such as cyclic steam stimulation (CSS) and steam-assisted gravity drainage (SAGD).

The largest Canadian oil sands deposit, the Athabasca oil sands is in the McMurray Formation, centered on the city of Fort McMurray, Alberta. It outcrops on the surface (zero burial depth) about 50 km (30 miles) north of Fort McMurray, where enormous oil sands mines have been established, but is 400 m (1,300 ft) deep southeast of Fort McMurray. Only 3% of the oil sands area containing about 20% of the recoverable oil can be produced by surface mining, so the remaining 80% will have to be produced using in-situ wells. The other Canadian deposits are between 350 and 900 m (1,000 and 3,000 ft) deep and will require in-situ production.

===== Athabasca =====
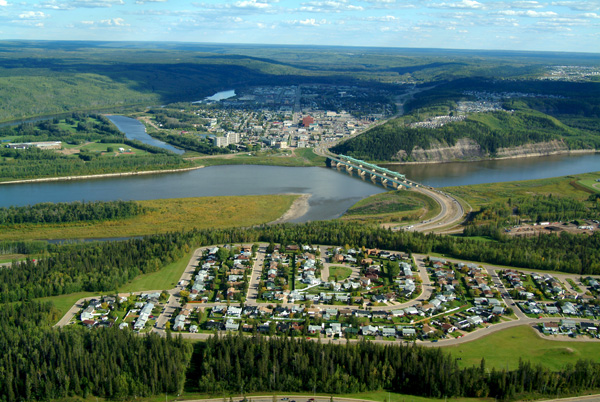
The City of Fort McMurray on the banks of the Athabasca River

The Athabasca oil sands, also known as the Athabasca tar sands, are large deposits of oil sands rich in bitumen, a heavy and viscous form of petroleum, in northeastern Alberta, Canada. These reserves are one of the largest sources of unconventional oil in the world, making Canada a significant player in the global energy market.

As of 2023, Canada's oil sands industry, along with Western Canada and offshore petroleum facilities near Newfoundland and Labrador, continued to increase production and were projected to increase by an estimated 10% in 2024 representing a potential record high at the end of the year of approximately 5.3 million barrels per day (bpd). The surge in production is attributed mainly to growth in Alberta's oilsands. The expansion of the Trans Mountain pipeline—the only oil pipeline to the West Coast—will further facilitate this increase, with its capacity set to increase significantly, to 890,000 barrels per day from 300,000 bpd currently. Despite this growth, there are warnings that it might be short-lived, with production potentially plateauing after 2024. Canada's anticipated increase in oil output exceeds that of other major producers like the United States, and the country is poised to become a significant driver of global crude oil production growth in 2024. The exploitation of these resources has stirred debates regarding economic development, energy security, and environmental impacts, particularly emissions from the oilsands, prompting discussions around emissions regulations for the oil and gas sector.

The Athabasca oil sands, along with the nearby Peace River and Cold Lake deposits oil sand deposits lie under 141,000 square kilometres (54,000 sq mi) of boreal forest and muskeg (peat bogs) according to Government of Alberta's Ministry of Energy, Alberta Energy Regulator (AER) and the Canadian Association of Petroleum Producers (CAPP).

===== Cold Lake =====
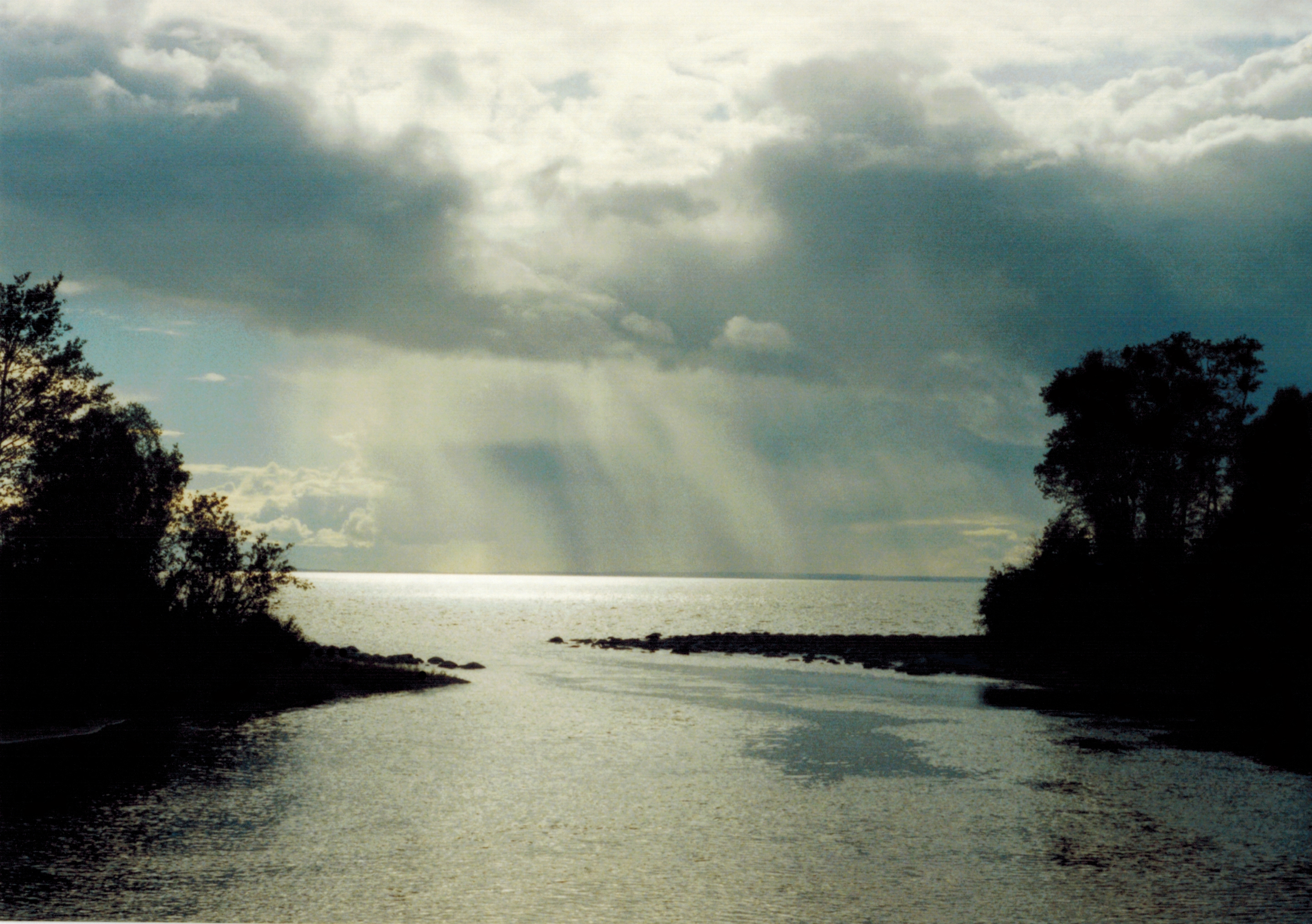
Cold Lake viewed from Meadow Lake Provincial Park, Saskatchewan

The Cold Lake oil sands are northeast of Alberta's capital, Edmonton, near the border with Saskatchewan. A small portion of the Cold Lake deposit lies in Saskatchewan. Although smaller than the Athabasca oil sands, the Cold Lake oil sands are important because some of the oil is fluid enough to be extracted by conventional methods. The Cold Lake bitumen contains more alkanes and less asphaltenes than the other major Alberta oil sands and the oil is more fluid. As a result, cyclic steam stimulation (CSS) is commonly used for production.

The Cold Lake oil sands are of a roughly circular shape, centered around Bonnyville, Alberta. They probably contain over 60 billion cubic metres (370 billion barrels) of extra-heavy oil-in-place. The oil is highly viscous, but considerably less so than the Athabasca oil sands, and is somewhat less sulfurous. The depth of the deposits is 400 to 600 metres (1,300 to 2,000 ft) and they are from 15 to 35 metres (49 to 115 ft) thick. They are too deep to surface mine.

Much of the oil sands are on Canadian Forces Base Cold Lake. CFB Cold Lake's CF-18 Hornet jet fighters defend the western half of Canadian air space and cover Canada's Arctic territory. Cold Lake Air Weapons Range (CLAWR) is one of the largest live-drop bombing ranges in the world, including testing of cruise missiles. As oil sands production continues to grow, various sectors vie for access to airspace, land, and resources, and this complicates oil well drilling and production significantly.

===== Peace River =====
Located in northwest-central Alberta, the Peace River oil sands deposit is the smallest of four large deposits of oil sands of the Western Canadian Sedimentary Basin formation.

The Peace River oil sands lie, generally, in the watershed of the Peace River.

The Peace River oil sands deposits are the smallest in the province. The largest, the Athabasca oil sands, are located to the east. The second largest, the Cold Lake oil sands deposit, is south of Athabaska and the Wabasco oil sands are south of Athabaska and usually linked to it. According to the Petroleum Economist, oil sands occur in more than 70 countries, but the bulk is found in these four regions, together covering an area of some 77,000 square kilometres (30,000 sq mi). In 2007, the World Energy Council estimated that these oil sands areas contained at least two-thirds of the world's discovered bitumen in place at the time, with an original oil-in-place (OOIP) reserve of 260,000,000,000 cubic metres (9.2×10^{12} cu ft) (1.6 trn barrels), an amount comparable to the total world reserves of conventional oil.

Whereas the Athabasca oil sands lie close enough to the surface that the sand can be scooped up in open-pit mines, and brought to a central location for processing, the Peace River deposits are considered too deep and are exploited in situ using steam-assisted gravity drainage (SAGD) and Cold Heavy Oil Production with Sand (CHOPS).

==== Venezuela ====
The Eastern Venezuelan Basin has a structure similar to the WCSB, but on a shorter scale. The distance the oil has migrated up-dip from the Sierra Oriental mountain front to the Orinoco oil sands where it pinches out against the igneous rocks of the Guyana Shield is only about 200 to 300 km (100 to 200 miles). The hydrodynamic conditions of oil transport were similar, source rocks buried deep by the rise of the mountains of the Sierra Orientale produced light oil that moved up-dip toward the south until it was gradually immobilized by the viscosity increase caused by biodgradation near the surface. The Orinoco deposits are early Tertiary (50 to 60 million years old) sand-silt-shale sequences overlain by continuous thick shales, much like the Canadian deposits.

In Venezuela, the Orinoco Belt oil sands range from 350 to 1,000 m (1,000 to 3,000 ft) deep and no surface outcrops exist. The deposit is about 500 km (300 miles) long east-to-west and 50 to 60 km (30 to 40 miles) wide north-to-south, much less than the combined area covered by the Canadian deposits. In general, the Canadian deposits are found over a much wider area, have a broader range of properties, and have a broader range of reservoir types than the Venezuelan ones, but the geological structures and mechanisms involved are similar. The main differences is that the oil in the sands in Venezuela is less viscous than in Canada, allowing some of it to be produced by conventional drilling techniques, but none of it approaches the surface as in Canada, meaning none of it can be produced using surface mining. The Canadian deposits will almost all have to be produced by mining or using new non-conventional techniques.

===== Orinoco =====
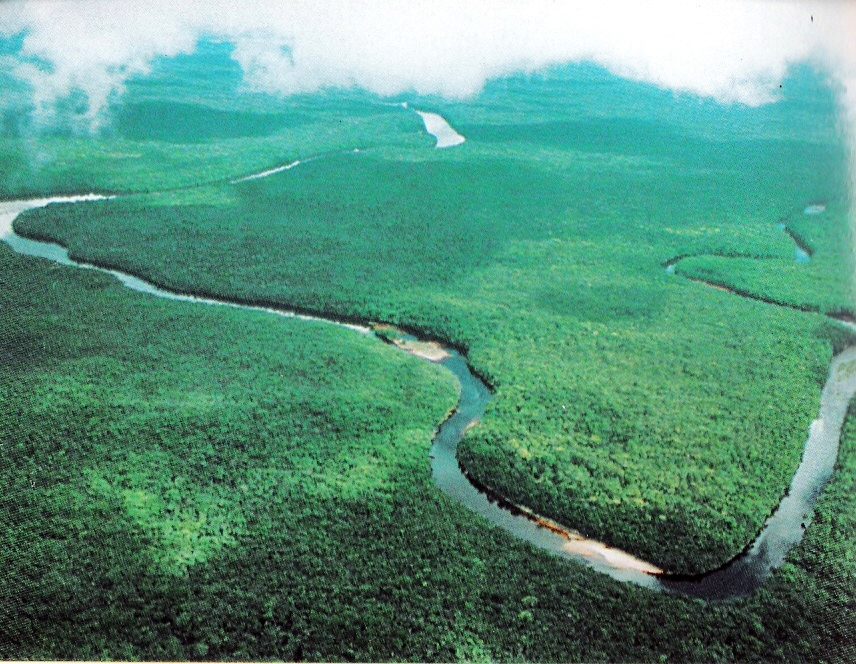
Panorama of the Orinoco River

The Orinoco Belt is a territory in the southern strip of the eastern Orinoco River Basin in Venezuela which overlies one of the world's largest deposits of petroleum. The Orinoco Belt follows the line of the river. It is approximately 600 kilometres (370 mi) from east to west, and 70 kilometres (43 mi) from north to south, with an area about 55,314 square kilometres (21,357 sq mi).

The oil sands consist of large deposits of extra heavy crude. Venezuela's heavy oil deposits of about 1,200 Gbbl (190×10^{9} m^{3}) of oil in place are estimated to approximately equal the world's reserves of lighter oil.

In 2009, the US Geological Survey (USGS) increased its estimates of the reserves to 513 Gbbl (81.6×10^{9} m^{3}) of oil which is "technically recoverable (producible using currently available technology and industry practices)." No estimate of how much of the oil is economically recoverable was made.

=== Other deposits ===
Location of Melville Island

In addition to the three major Canadian oil sands in Alberta, there is a fourth major oil sands deposit in Canada, the Melville Island oil sands in the Canadian Arctic islands, which are too remote to expect commercial production in the foreseeable future.

Apart from the megagiant oil sands deposits in Canada and Venezuela, numerous other countries hold smaller oil sands deposits. In the United States, there are supergiant oil sands resources primarily concentrated in Eastern Utah, with a total of 32 Gbbl (5.1×10^{9} m^{3}) of oil (known and potential) in eight major deposits in Carbon, Garfield, Grand, Uintah, and Wayne counties. In addition to being much smaller than the Canadian oil sands deposits, the US oil sands are hydrocarbon-wet, whereas the Canadian oil sands are water-wet. This requires somewhat different extraction techniques for the Utah oil sands from those used for the Alberta oil sands.

Russia holds oil sands in two main regions. Large resources are present in the Tunguska Basin, East Siberia, with the largest deposits being Olenyok and Siligir. Other deposits are located in the Timan-Pechora and Volga-Urals basins (in and around Tatarstan), which is an important but very mature province in terms of conventional oil, holds large amounts of oil sands in a shallow Permian formation. In Kazakhstan, large bitumen deposits are located in the North Caspian Basin.

In Madagascar, Tsimiroro and Bemolanga are two heavy oil sands deposits, with a pilot well already producing small amounts of oil in Tsimiroro. and larger scale exploitation in the early planning phase. In the Republic of the Congo reserves are estimated between 0.5 and 2.5 Gbbl (79×10^{6} and 397×10^{6} m^{3}).

== Production ==
Bituminous sands are a major source of unconventional oil, although only Canada has a large-scale commercial oil sands industry. In 2006, bitumen production in Canada averaged 1.25 Mbbl/d (200,000 m^{3}/d) through 81 oil sands projects. 44% of Canadian oil production in 2007 was from oil sands. This proportion was (as of 2008) expected to increase in coming decades as bitumen production grows while conventional oil production declines, although due to the 2008 economic downturn work on new projects has been deferred. Petroleum is not produced from oil sands on a significant level in other countries.

=== Canada ===
The Alberta oil sands have been in commercial production since the original Great Canadian Oil Sands (now Suncor Energy) mine began operation in 1967. Syncrude's second mine began operation in 1978 and is the biggest mine of any type in the world. The third mine in the Athabasca Oil Sands, the Albian Sands consortium of Shell Canada, Chevron Corporation, and Western Oil Sands Inc. (purchased by Marathon Oil Corporation in 2007) began operation in 2003. Petro-Canada was also developing a $33 billion Fort Hills Project, in partnership with UTS Energy Corporation and Teck Cominco, which lost momentum after the 2009 merger of Petro-Canada into Suncor.

By 2013 there were nine oil sands mining projects in the Athabasca oil sands deposit: Suncor Energy Inc. (Suncor), Syncrude Canada Limited (Syncrude)'s Mildred Lake and Aurora North, Shell Canada Limited (Shell)'s Muskeg River and Jackpine, Canadian Natural Resources Limited (CNRL)'s Horizon, Imperial Oil Resources Ventures Limited (Imperial), Kearl Oil Sands Project (KOSP), Total E&P Canada Ltd. Joslyn North Mine and Fort Hills Energy Corporation (FHEC). In 2011 alone they produced over 52 million cubic metres of bitumen.

Canadian oil sand extraction has created extensive environmental damage, and many first nations peoples, scientists, lawyers, journalists and environmental groups have described Canadian oil sands mining as an ecocide. Methane projections from Canada's oil sands tailings using scientific deep learning reveal significant underestimation.

From the beginning of 2022 oil sands extraction in Alberta has sharply increased, overpassing by far the level of 2014. High oil prices is one of the causes. In 2024 it is projected to increase more, so Canada can become a leader in oil production.

=== Venezuela ===
No significant development of Venezuela's extra-heavy oil deposits was undertaken before 2000, except for the BITOR operation which produced somewhat less than 100,000 barrels of oil per day (16,000 m^{3}/d) of 9°API oil by primary production. This was mostly shipped as an emulsion (Orimulsion) of 70% oil and 30% water with similar characteristics as heavy fuel oil for burning in thermal power plants. However, when a major strike hit the Venezuelan state oil company PDVSA, most of the engineers were fired as punishment. Orimulsion had been the pride of the PDVSA engineers, so Orimulsion fell out of favor with the key political leaders. As a result, the government has been trying to "Wind Down" the Orimulsion program.

Despite the fact that the Orinoco oil sands contain extra-heavy oil which is easier to produce than Canada's similarly sized reserves of bitumen, Venezuela's oil production has been declining in recent years because of the country's political and economic problems, while Canada's has been increasing. As a result, Canadian heavy oil and bitumen exports have been backing Venezuelan heavy and extra-heavy oil out of the US market, and Canada's total exports of oil to the US have become several times as great as Venezuela's.

By 2016, with the economy of Venezuela in a tailspin and the country experiencing widespread shortages of food, rolling power blackouts, rioting, and anti-government protests, it was unclear how much new oil sands production would occur in the near future.

=== Other countries ===
In May 2008, the Italian oil company Eni announced a project to develop a small oil sands deposit in the Republic of the Congo. Production is scheduled to commence in 2014 and is estimated to eventually yield a total of 40,000 bbl/d (6,400 m^{3}/d).

== Methods of extraction ==
Except for a fraction of the extra-heavy oil or bitumen which can be extracted by conventional oil well technology, oil sands must be produced by strip mining or the oil made to flow into wells using sophisticated in-situ techniques. These methods usually use more water and require larger amounts of energy than conventional oil extraction. While much of Canada's oil sands are being produced using open-pit mining, approximately 90% of Canadian oil sands and all of Venezuela's oil sands are too far below the surface to use surface mining.

=== Primary production ===
Conventional crude oil is normally extracted from the ground by drilling oil wells into a petroleum reservoir, allowing oil to flow into them under natural reservoir pressures, although artificial lift and techniques such as horizontal drilling, water flooding and gas injection are often required to maintain production. When primary production is used in the Venezuelan oil sands, where the extra-heavy oil is about 50 degrees Celsius, the typical oil recovery rates are about 8–12%. Canadian oil sands are much colder and more biodegraded, so bitumen recovery rates are usually only about 5–6%. Historically, primary recovery was used in the more fluid areas of Canadian oil sands. However, it recovered only a small fraction of the oil in place, so it is not often used today.

=== Surface mining ===
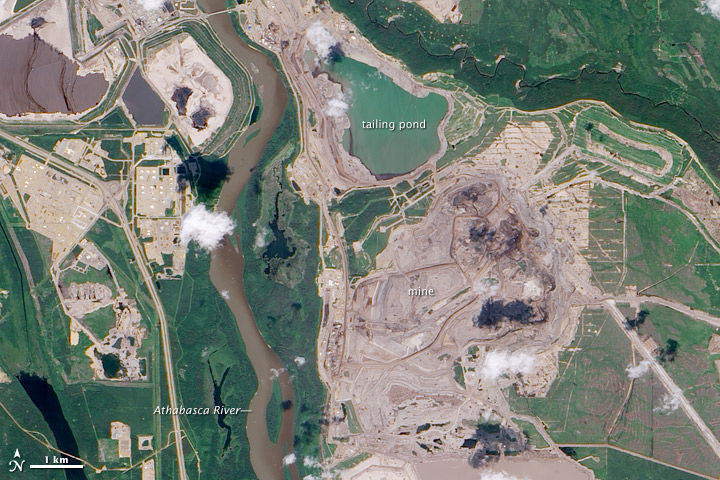
Mining operations in the Athabasca oil sands. NASA Earth Observatory image, 2009.

Surface mining of oil sands involves removing overburden, then transporting the oil sands into a crushing mechanism into slurry, where the oil sands are then further processed. The Athabasca oil sands are the only major oil sands deposits which are shallow enough to surface mine. In the Athabasca sands there are very large amounts of bitumen covered by little overburden, making surface mining the most efficient method of extracting it. The overburden consists of water-laden muskeg (peat bog) overtop of clay and barren sand. The oil sands themselves are typically 40 to 60 metres (130 to 200 ft) thick deposits of crude bitumen embedded in unconsolidated sandstone, sitting on top of flat limestone rock. Since Great Canadian Oil Sands (now Suncor Energy) started operation of the first large-scale oil sands mine in 1967, bitumen has been extracted on a commercial scale and the volume has grown at a steady rate ever since.

A large number of oil sands mines are currently in operation and more are in the stages of approval or development. The Syncrude Canada mine was the second to open in 1978, Shell Canada opened its Muskeg River mine (Albian Sands) in 2003 and Canadian Natural Resources Ltd (CNRL) opened its Horizon Oil Sands project in 2009. Newer mines include Shell Canada's Jackpine mine, Imperial Oil's Kearl Oil Sands Project, the Synenco Energy (now owned by TotalEnergies) Northern Lights mine, and Suncor's Fort Hills mine.

==== Oil sands tailings ponds ====
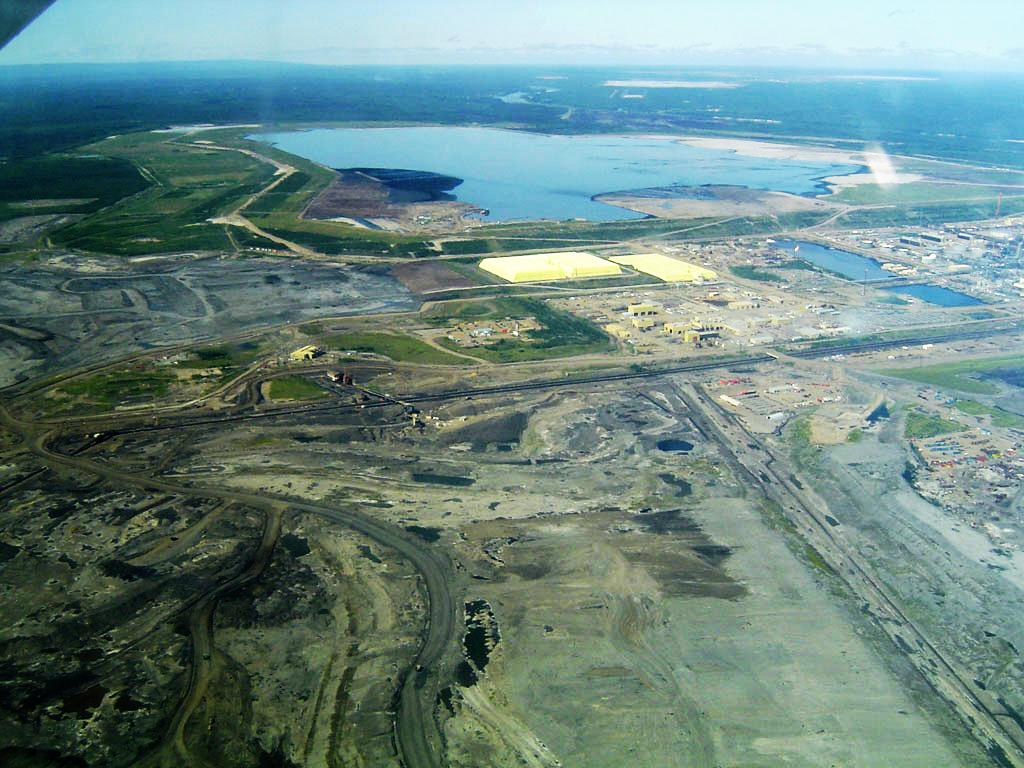
Syncrude's Mildred Lake site, plant and tailings ponds Fort McMurray, Alberta

Oil sands tailings ponds are engineered dam and dyke systems that contain salts, suspended solids and other dissolvable chemical compounds such as naphthenic acids, benzene, hydrocarbons residual bitumen, fine silts (mature fine tails MFT), and water. Large volumes of tailings are a byproduct of surface mining of the oil sands and managing these tailings are one of the most damaging aspects of tar sands. The Government of Alberta reported in 2013 that tailings ponds in the Alberta oil sands covered an area of about 77 square kilometres (30 sq mi). The Syncrude Tailings Dam or Mildred Lake Settling Basin (MLSB) is an embankment dam that is, by volume of construction material, the largest earth structure in the world in 2001.

=== Cold Heavy Oil Production with Sand (CHOPS) ===
Some years ago Canadian oil companies discovered that if they removed the sand filters from heavy oil wells and produced as much sand as possible with the oil, production rates improved significantly. This technique became known as Cold Heavy Oil Production with Sand (CHOPS). Further research disclosed that pumping out sand opened "wormholes" in the sand formation which allowed more oil to reach the wellbore. The advantage of this method is better production rates and recovery (around 10% versus 5–6% with sand filters in place) and the disadvantage that disposing of the produced sand is a problem. A novel way to do this was spreading it on rural roads, which rural governments liked because the oily sand reduced dust and the oil companies did their road maintenance for them. However, governments have become concerned about the large volume and composition of oil spread on roads. so in recent years disposing of oily sand in underground salt caverns has become more common.

=== Cyclic Steam Stimulation (CSS) ===
The use of steam injection to recover heavy oil has been in use in the oil fields of California since the 1950s. The cyclic steam stimulation (CSS) "huff-and-puff" method is now widely used in heavy oil production worldwide due to its quick early production rates; however recovery factors are relatively low (10–40% of oil in place) compared to SAGD (60–70% of OIP).

CSS has been in use by Imperial Oil at Cold Lake since 1985 and is also used by Canadian Natural Resources at Primrose and Wolf Lake and by Shell Canada at Peace River. In this method, the well is put through cycles of steam injection, soak, and oil production. First, steam is injected into a well at a temperature of 300 to 340 degrees Celsius for a period of weeks to months; then, the well is allowed to sit for days to weeks to allow heat to soak into the formation; and, later, the hot oil is pumped out of the well for a period of weeks or months. Once the production rate falls off, the well is put through another cycle of injection, soak and production. This process is repeated until the cost of injecting steam becomes higher than the money made from producing oil.

=== Steam-assisted gravity drainage (SAGD) ===
Steam-assisted gravity drainage was developed in the 1980s by the Alberta Oil Sands Technology and Research Authority and fortuitously coincided with improvements in directional drilling technology that made it quick and inexpensive to do by the mid 1990s. In SAGD, two horizontal wells are drilled in the oil sands, one at the bottom of the formation and another about 5 metres above it. These wells are typically drilled in groups off central pads and can extend for miles in all directions. In each well pair, steam is injected into the upper well, the heat melts the bitumen, which allows it to flow into the lower well, where it is pumped to the surface.

SAGD has proved to be a major breakthrough in production technology since it is cheaper than CSS, allows very high oil production rates, and recovers up to 60% of the oil in place. Because of its economic feasibility and applicability to a vast area of oil sands, this method alone quadrupled North American oil reserves and allowed Canada to move to second place in world oil reserves after Saudi Arabia. Most major Canadian oil companies now have SAGD projects in production or under construction in Alberta's oil sands areas and in Wyoming. Examples include Japan Canada Oil Sands Ltd's (JACOS) project, Suncor's Firebag project, Nexen's Long Lake project, Suncor's (formerly Petro-Canada's) MacKay River project, Husky Energy's Tucker Lake and Sunrise projects, Shell Canada's Peace River project, Cenovus Energy's Foster Creek and Christina Lake developments, ConocoPhillips' Surmont project, Devon Canada's Jackfish project, and Derek Oil & Gas's LAK Ranch project. Alberta's OSUM Corp has combined proven underground mining technology with SAGD to enable higher recovery rates by running wells underground from within the oil sands deposit, thus also reducing energy requirements compared to traditional SAGD. This particular technology application is in its testing phase.

=== Vapor Extraction (VAPEX) ===
Several methods use solvents, instead of steam, to separate bitumen from sand. Some solvent extraction methods may work better in in situ production and other in mining. Solvent can be beneficial if it produces more oil while requiring less energy to produce steam.

Vapor Extraction Process (VAPEX) is an in situ technology, similar to SAGD. Instead of steam, hydrocarbon solvents are injected into an upper well to dilute bitumen and enables the diluted bitumen to flow into a lower well. It has the advantage of much better energy efficiency over steam injection, and it does some partial upgrading of bitumen to oil right in the formation. The process has attracted attention from oil companies, who are experimenting with it.

The above methods are not mutually exclusive. It is becoming common for wells to be put through one CSS injection-soak-production cycle to condition the formation prior to going to SAGD production, and companies are experimenting with combining VAPEX with SAGD to improve recovery rates and lower energy costs.

=== Toe to Heel Air Injection (THAI) ===
This is a very new and experimental method that combines a vertical air injection well with a horizontal production well. The process ignites oil in the reservoir and creates a vertical wall of fire moving from the "toe" of the horizontal well toward the "heel", which burns the heavier oil components and upgrades some of the heavy bitumen into lighter oil right in the formation. Historically fireflood projects have not worked out well because of difficulty in controlling the flame front and a propensity to set the producing wells on fire. However, some oil companies feel the THAI method will be more controllable and practical, and have the advantage of not requiring energy to create steam.

Advocates of this method of extraction state that it uses less freshwater, produces 50% less greenhouse gases, and has a smaller footprint than other production techniques.

Petrobank Energy and Resources has reported encouraging results from their test wells in Alberta, with production rates of up to 400 bbl/d (64 m^{3}/d) per well, and the oil upgraded from 8 to 12 API degrees. The company hopes to get a further 7-degree upgrade from its CAPRI (controlled atmospheric pressure resin infusion) system, which pulls the oil through a catalyst lining the lower pipe.

After several years of production in situ, it has become clear that current THAI methods do not work as planned. Amid steady drops in production from their THAI wells at Kerrobert, Petrobank has written down the value of their THAI patents and the reserves at the facility to zero. They have plans to experiment with a new configuration they call "multi-THAI," involving adding more air injection wells.

=== Combustion Overhead Gravity Drainage (COGD) ===
This is an experimental method that employs a number of vertical air injection wells above a horizontal production well located at the base of the bitumen pay zone. An initial Steam Cycle similar to CSS is used to prepare the bitumen for ignition and mobility. Following that cycle, air is injected into the vertical wells, igniting the upper bitumen and mobilizing (through heating) the lower bitumen to flow into the production well. It is expected that COGD will result in water savings of 80% compared to SAGD.

=== Froth treatment ===
Bitumen froth treatment is a process used in the Athabasca oil sands (AOS) bitumen recovery operations to remove fine inorganics—water and mineral particles—from bitumen froth, by diluting the bitumen with a light hydrocarbon solvent—either naphthenic or paraffinic—to reduce the viscosity of the froth and to remove contaminants that were not removed in previous water-based gravity recovery phases. Bitumen with a high viscosity or with too many contaminants, is not suitable for transporting through pipelines or refining. The original and conventional naphthenic froth treatment (NFT) uses a naphtha solvent with the addition of chemicals. Paraffinic Solvent Froth Treatment (PSFT), which was first used commercially in the Albian Sands in the early 2000s, results in a cleaner bitumen with lower levels of contaminates, such as water and mineral solids. Following froth treatments, bitumen can be further upgraded using "heat to produce synthetic crude oil by means of a coker unit."

== Energy balance ==
Approximately 1.0–1.25 gigajoules (280–350 kWh) of energy is needed to extract a barrel of bitumen and upgrade it to synthetic crude. As of 2006, most of this is produced by burning natural gas. Since a barrel of oil equivalent is about 6.117 gigajoules (1,699 kWh), its EROEI is 5–6. That means this extracts about 5 or 6 times as much energy as is consumed. Energy efficiency is expected to improve to an average of 900 cubic feet (25 m^{3}) of natural gas or 0.945 gigajoules (262 kWh) of energy per barrel by 2015, giving an EROEI of about 6.5.

Alternatives to natural gas exist and are available in the oil sands area. Bitumen can itself be used as the fuel, consuming about 30–35% of the raw bitumen per produced unit of synthetic crude. Nexen's Long Lake project will use a proprietary deasphalting technology to upgrade the bitumen, using asphaltene residue fed to a gasifier whose syngas will be used by a cogeneration turbine and a hydrogen producing unit, providing all the energy needs of the project: steam, hydrogen, and electricity. Thus, it will produce syncrude without consuming natural gas, but the capital cost is very high.

Shortages of natural gas for project fuel were forecast to be a problem for Canadian oil sands production a few years ago, but recent increases in US shale gas production have eliminated much of the problem for North America. With the increasing use of hydraulic fracturing making US largely self-sufficient in natural gas and exporting more natural gas to Eastern Canada to replace Alberta gas, the Alberta government is using its powers under the NAFTA and the Canadian Constitution to reduce shipments of natural gas to the US and Eastern Canada, and divert the gas to domestic Alberta use, particularly for oil sands fuel. The natural gas pipelines to the east and south are being converted to carry increasing oil sands production to these destinations instead of gas. Canada also has huge undeveloped shale gas deposits in addition to those of the US, so natural gas for future oil sands production does not seem to be a serious problem. The low price of natural gas as the result of new production has considerably improved the economics of oil sands production.

== Upgrading and blending ==
The extra-heavy crude oil or crude bitumen extracted from oil sands is a very viscous semisolid form of oil that does not easily flow at normal temperatures, making it difficult to transport to market by pipeline. To flow through oil pipelines, it must either be upgraded to lighter synthetic crude oil (SCO), blended with diluents to form dilbit, or heated to reduce its viscosity.

=== Canada ===
In the Canadian oil sands, bitumen produced by surface mining is generally upgraded on-site and delivered as synthetic crude oil. This makes delivery of oil to market through conventional oil pipelines quite easy. On the other hand, bitumen produced by the in-situ projects is generally not upgraded but delivered to market in raw form. If the agent used to upgrade the bitumen to synthetic crude is not produced on site, it must be sourced elsewhere and transported to the site of upgrading. If the upgraded crude is being transported from the site by pipeline, and additional pipeline will be required to bring in sufficient upgrading agent. The costs of production of the upgrading agent, the pipeline to transport it and the cost to operate the pipeline must be calculated into the production cost of the synthetic crude.

Upon reaching a refinery, the synthetic crude is processed and a significant portion of the upgrading agent will be removed during the refining process. It may be used for other fuel fractions, but the end result is that liquid fuel has to be piped to the upgrading facility simply to make the bitumen transportable by pipeline. If all costs are considered, synthetic crude production and transfer using bitumen and an upgrading agent may prove economically unsustainable.

When the first oil sands plants were built over 50 years ago, most oil refineries in their market area were designed to handle light or medium crude oil with lower sulfur content than the 4–7% that is typically found in bitumen. The original oil sands upgraders were designed to produce a high-quality synthetic crude oil (SCO) with lower density and lower sulfur content. These are large, expensive plants which are much like heavy oil refineries. Research is currently being done on designing simpler upgraders which do not produce SCO but simply treat the bitumen to reduce its viscosity, allowing to be transported unblended like conventional heavy oil.

Western Canadian Select, launched in 2004 as a new heavy oil stream, blended at the Husky Energy terminal in Hardisty, Alberta, is the largest crude oil stream coming from the Canadian oil sands and the benchmark for emerging heavy, high TAN (acidic) crudes. Western Canadian Select (WCS) is traded at Cushing, Oklahoma, a major oil supply hub connecting oil suppliers to the Gulf Coast, which has become the most significant trading hub for crude oil in North America. While its major component is bitumen, it also contains a combination of sweet synthetic and condensate diluents, and 25 existing streams of both conventional and unconventional oil making it a syndilbit—both a dilbit and a synbit.

The first step in upgrading is vacuum distillation to separate the lighter fractions. After that, de-asphalting is used to separate the asphalt from the feedstock. Cracking is used to break the heavier hydrocarbon molecules down into simpler ones. Since cracking produces products which are rich in sulfur, desulfurization must be done to get the sulfur content below 0.5% and create sweet, light synthetic crude oil.

In 2012, Alberta produced about 1,900,000 bbl/d (300,000 m^{3}/d) of crude bitumen from its three major oil sands deposits, of which about 1,044,000 bbl/d (166,000 m^{3}/d) was upgraded to lighter products and the rest sold as raw bitumen. The volume of both upgraded and non-upgraded bitumen is increasing yearly. Alberta has five oil sands upgraders producing a variety of products. These include:

- Suncor Energy can upgrade 440,000 bbl/d (70,000 m^{3}/d) of bitumen to light sweet and medium sour synthetic crude oil (SCO), plus produce diesel fuel for its oil sands operations at the upgrader.
- Syncrude can upgrade 407,000 bbl/d (64,700 m^{3}/d) of bitumen to sweet light SCO.
- Canadian Natural Resources Limited (CNRL) can upgrade 141,000 bbl/d (22,400 m^{3}/d) of bitumen to sweet light SCO.
- Nexen, since 2013 wholly owned by China National Offshore Oil Corporation (CNOOC), can upgrade 72,000 bbl/d (11,400 m^{3}/d) of bitumen to sweet light SCO.
- Shell Canada operates its Scotford Upgrader in combination with an oil refinery and chemical plant at Scotford, Alberta, near Edmonton. The complex can upgrade 255,000 bbl/d (40,500 m^{3}/d) of bitumen to sweet and heavy SCO as well as a range of refinery and chemical products.

Modernized and new large refineries such as are found in the Midwestern United States and on the Gulf Coast of the United States, as well as many in China, can handle upgrading heavy oil themselves, so their demand is for non-upgraded bitumen and extra-heavy oil rather than SCO. The main problem is that the feedstock would be too viscous to flow through pipelines, so unless it is delivered by tanker or rail car, it must be blended with diluent to enable it to flow. This requires mixing the crude bitumen with a lighter hydrocarbon diluent such as condensate from gas wells, pentanes and other light products from oil refineries or gas plants, or synthetic crude oil from oil sands upgraders to allow it to flow through pipelines to market.

Typically, blended bitumen contains about 30% natural gas condensate or other diluents and 70% bitumen. Alternatively, bitumen can also be delivered to market by specially designed railway tank cars, tank trucks, liquid cargo barges, or ocean-going oil tankers. These do not necessarily require the bitumen be blended with diluent since the tanks can be heated to allow the oil to be pumped out.

The demand for condensate for oil sands diluent is expected to be more than 750,000 bbl/d (119,000 m^{3}/d) by 2020, double 2012 volumes. Since Western Canada only produces about 150,000 bbl/d (24,000 m^{3}/d) of condensate, the supply was expected to become a major constraint on bitumen transport. However, the recent huge increase in US tight oil production has largely solved this problem, because much of the production is too light for US refinery use but ideal for diluting bitumen. The surplus American condensate and light oil is being exported to Canada and blended with bitumen, and then re-imported to the US as feedstock for refineries. Since the diluent is simply exported and then immediately re-imported, it is not subject to the US ban on exports of crude oil. Once it is back in the US, refineries separate the diluent and re-export it to Canada, which again bypasses US crude oil export laws since it is now a refinery product. To aid in this process, Kinder Morgan Energy Partners is reversing its Cochin Pipeline, which used to carry propane from Edmonton to Chicago, to transport 95,000 bbl/d (15,100 m^{3}/d) of condensate from Chicago to Edmonton by mid-2014; and Enbridge is considering the expansion of its Southern Lights pipeline, which currently ships 180,000 bbl/d (29,000 m^{3}/d) of diluent from the Chicago area to Edmonton, by adding another 100,000 bbl/d (16,000 m^{3}/d).

=== Venezuela ===
Although Venezuelan extra-heavy oil is less viscous than Canadian bitumen, much of the difference is due to temperature. Once the oil comes out of the ground and cools, it has the same difficulty in that it is too viscous to flow through pipelines. Venezuela is now producing more extra heavy crude in the Orinoco oil sands than its four upgraders, which were built by foreign oil companies over a decade ago, can handle. The upgraders have a combined capacity of 630,000 bbl/d (100,000 m^{3}/d), which is only half of its production of extra-heavy oil. In addition Venezuela produces insufficient volumes of naphtha to use as diluent to move extra-heavy oil to market. Unlike Canada, Venezuela does not produce much natural gas condensate from its own gas wells, nor does it have easy access to condensate from new US shale gas production. Since Venezuela also has insufficient refinery capacity to supply its domestic market, supplies of naptha are insufficient to use as pipeline diluent, and it is having to import naptha to fill the gap. Since Venezuela also has financial problems—as a result of the country's economic crisis—and political disagreements with the US government and oil companies, the situation remains unresolved.

== Refining ==
Heavy crude feedstock needs pre-processing before it is fit for conventional refineries, although heavy oil and bitumen refineries can do the pre-processing themselves. This pre-processing is called "upgrading", the key components of which are as follows:

1. removal of water, sand, physical waste, and lighter products
2. catalytic purification by hydrodemetallisation (HDM), hydrodesulfurization (HDS) and hydrodenitrogenation (HDN)
3. hydrogenation through carbon rejection or catalytic hydrocracking (HCR)

As carbon rejection is very inefficient and wasteful in most cases, catalytic hydrocracking is preferred in most cases. All these processes take large amounts of energy and water, while emitting more carbon dioxide than conventional oil.

Catalytic purification and hydrocracking are together known as hydroprocessing. The big challenge in hydroprocessing is to deal with the impurities found in heavy crude, as they poison the catalysts over time. Many efforts have been made to deal with this to ensure high activity and long life of a catalyst. Catalyst materials and pore size distributions are key parameters that need to be optimized to deal with this challenge and varies from place to place, depending on the kind of feedstock present.

=== Canada ===
There are four major oil refineries in Alberta which supply most of Western Canada with petroleum products, but as of 2012 these processed less than 1/4 of the approximately 1,900,000 bbl/d (300,000 m^{3}/d) of bitumen and SCO produced in Alberta. Some of the large oil sands upgraders also produced diesel fuel as part of their operations. Some of the oil sands bitumen and SCO went to refineries in other provinces, but most of it was exported to the United States. The four major Alberta refineries are:

- Suncor Energy operates the Petro-Canada refinery near Edmonton, which can process 142,000 bbl/d (22,600 m^{3}/d) of all types of oil and bitumen into all types of products.
- Imperial Oil operates the Strathcona Refinery near Edmonton, which can process 187,200 bbl/d (29,760 m^{3}/d) of SCO and conventional oil into all types of products.
- Shell Canada operates the Scotford Refinery near Edmonton, which is integrated with the Scotford Upgrader, and which can process 100,000 bbl/d (16,000 m^{3}/d) of all types of oil and bitumen into all types of products.
- Husky Energy, operates the Husky Lloydminster Refinery in Lloydminster, which can process 28,300 bbl/d (4,500 m^{3}/d) of feedstock from the adjacent Husky Upgrader into bitumen and other products.

The $8.5 billion Sturgeon Refinery, a fifth major Alberta refinery, is under construction near Fort Saskatchewan with a completion date of 2017.

The Pacific Future Energy project proposed a new refinery in British Columbia that would process bitumen into fuel for Asian and Canadian markets. Pacific Future Energy proposes to transport near-solid bitumen to the refinery using railway tank cars.

Most of the Canadian oil refining industry is foreign-owned. Canadian refineries can process only about 25% of the oil produced in Canada. Canadian refineries, outside of Alberta and Saskatchewan, were originally built for light and medium crude oil. With new oil sands production coming on production at lower prices than international oil, market price imbalances have ruined the economics of refineries which could not process it.

=== United States ===
Prior to 2013, when China surpassed it, the United States was the largest oil importer in the world. Unlike Canada, the US has hundreds of oil refineries, many of which have been modified to process heavy oil as US production of light and medium oil declined. The main market for Canadian bitumen as well as Venezuelan extra-heavy oil was assumed to be the US. The United States has historically been Canada's largest customer for crude oil and products, particularly in recent years. American imports of oil and products from Canada grew from 450,000 bbl/d (72,000 m^{3}/d) in 1981 to 3,120,000 bbl/d (496,000 m^{3}/d) in 2013 as Canada's oil sands produced more and more oil, while in the US, domestic production and imports from other countries declined. However, this relationship is becoming strained due to physical, economic and political influences. Export pipeline capacity is approaching its limits; Canadian oil is selling at a discount to world market prices; US demand for crude oil and product imports has declined because of US economic problems; and US oil domestic unconventional oil production (shale oil production from fracking is growing rapidly.) The US resumed export of crude oil in 2016; as of early 2019, the US produced as much oil as it consumed, with shale oil displacing Canadian imports.

For the benefit of oil marketers, in 2004 Western Canadian producers created a new benchmark crude oil called Western Canadian Select, (WCS), a bitumen-derived heavy crude oil blend that is similar in its transportation and refining characteristics to California, Mexico Maya, or Venezuela heavy crude oils. This heavy oil has an API gravity of 19–21 and despite containing large amounts of bitumen and synthetic crude oil, flows through pipelines well and is classified as "conventional heavy oil" by governments. There are several hundred thousand barrels per day of this blend being imported into the US, in addition to larger amounts of crude bitumen and synthetic crude oil (SCO) from the oil sands.

The demand from US refineries is increasingly for non-upgraded bitumen rather than SCO. The Canadian National Energy Board (NEB) expects SCO volumes to double to around 1,900,000 bbl/d (300,000 m^{3}/d) by 2035, but not keep pace with the total increase in bitumen production. It projects that the portion of oil sands production that is upgraded to SCO to decline from 49% in 2010 to 37% in 2035. This implies that over 3,200,000 bbl/d (510,000 m^{3}/d) of bitumen will have to be blended with diluent for delivery to market.

=== Asia ===
Demand for oil in Asia has been growing much faster than in North America or Europe. In 2013, China replaced the United States as the world's largest importer of crude oil, and its demand continues to grow much faster than its production. The main impediment to Canadian exports to Asia is pipeline capacity – The only pipeline capable of delivering oil sands production to Canada's Pacific Coast is the Trans Mountain Pipeline from Edmonton to Vancouver, which is now operating at its capacity of 300,000 bbl/d (48,000 m^{3}/d) supplying refineries in B.C. and Washington State. However, once complete, the Northern Gateway pipeline and the Trans Mountain expansion currently undergoing government review are expected to deliver an additional 500,000 bbl/d (79,000 m^{3}/d) to 1,100,000 bbl/d (170,000 m^{3}/d) to tankers on the Pacific coast, from where they could deliver it anywhere in the world. There is sufficient heavy oil refinery capacity in China and India to refine the additional Canadian volume, possibly with some modifications to the refineries. In recent years, Chinese oil companies such as China Petrochemical Corporation (Sinopec), China National Offshore Oil Corporation (CNOOC), and PetroChina have bought over $30 billion in assets in Canadian oil sands projects, so they would probably like to export some of their newly acquired oil to China.

== Economics ==
The world's largest deposits of bitumen are in Canada, although Venezuela's deposits of extra-heavy crude oil are even bigger. Canada has vast energy resources of all types and its oil and natural gas resource base would be large enough to meet Canadian needs for generations if demand was sustained. Abundant hydroelectric resources account for the majority of Canada's electricity production and very little electricity is produced from oil.

The National Energy Board (NEB) reported in 2013, that if oil prices are above $100, Canada would have more than enough energy to meet its growing needs. The excess oil production from the oil sands could be exported. The major importing country would probably continue to be the United States, although before the developments in 2014, there was increasing demand for oil, particularly heavy oil, from Asian countries such as China and India.

Canada has abundant resources of bitumen and crude oil, with an estimated remaining ultimate resource potential of 54 billion cubic metres (340 billion barrels). Of this, oil sands bitumen accounts for 90 per cent. Alberta currently accounts for all of Canada's bitumen resources. "Resources" become "reserves" only after it is proven that economic recovery can be achieved. At 2013 prices using current technology, Canada had remaining oil reserves of 27 billion m^{3} (170 billion bbls), with 98% of this attributed to oil sands bitumen. This put its reserves in third place in the world behind Venezuela and Saudi Arabia. At the much lower prices of 2015, the reserves are much smaller.

=== Costs ===
The costs of production and transportation of saleable petroleum from oil sands is typically significantly higher than from conventional global sources. Hence the economic viability of oil sands production is more vulnerable to the price of oil. The price of benchmark West Texas Intermediate (WTI) oil at Cushing, Oklahoma above US$100/bbl that prevailed until late 2014 was sufficient to promote active growth in oil sands production. Major Canadian oil companies had announced expansion plans and foreign companies were investing significant amounts of capital, in many cases forming partnerships with Canadian companies. Investment had been shifting towards in-situ steam-assisted gravity drainage (SAGD) projects and away from mining and upgrading projects, as oil sands operators foresee better opportunities from selling bitumen and heavy oil directly to refineries than from upgrading it to synthetic crude oil. Cost estimates for Canada include the effects of the mining when the mines are returned to the environment in "as good as or better than original condition". Cleanup of the end products of consumption are the responsibility of the consuming jurisdictions, which are mostly in provinces or countries other than the producing one.

The Alberta government estimated that in 2012, the supply cost of oil sands new mining operations was $70 to $85 per barrel, whereas the cost of new SAGD projects was $50 to $80 per barrel. These costs included capital and operating costs, royalties and taxes, plus a reasonable profit to the investors. Since the price of WTI rose to $100/bbl beginning in 2011, production from oil sands was then expected to be highly profitable assuming the product could be delivered to markets. The main market was the huge refinery complexes on the US Gulf Coast, which are generally capable of processing Canadian bitumen and Venezuelan extra-heavy oil without upgrading.

The Canadian Energy Research Institute (CERI) performed an analysis, estimating that in 2012 the average plant gate costs (including 10% profit margin, but excluding blending and transport) of primary recovery was $30.32/bbl, of SAGD was $47.57/bbl, of mining and upgrading was $99.02/bbl, and of mining without upgrading was $68.30/bbl. Thus, all types of oil sands projects except new mining projects with integrated upgraders were expected to be consistently profitable from 2011 onward, provided that global oil prices remained favourable. Since the larger and more sophisticated refineries preferred to buy raw bitumen and heavy oil rather than synthetic crude oil, new oil sands projects avoided the costs of building new upgraders. Although primary recovery such as is done in Venezuela is cheaper than SAGD, it only recovers about 10% of the oil in place versus 60% or more for SAGD and over 99% for mining. Canadian oil companies were in a more competitive market and had access to more capital than in Venezuela, and preferred to spend that extra money on SAGD or mining to recover more oil.

Then in late 2014 the dramatic rise in U.S. production from shale formations, combined with a global economic malaise that reduced demand, caused the price of WTI to drop below $50, where it remained as of late 2015. In 2015, the Canadian Energy Research Institute (CERI) re-estimated the average plant gate costs (again including 10% profit margin) of SAGD to be $58.65/bbl, and 70.18/bbl for mining without upgrading. Including costs of blending and transportation, the WTI equivalent supply costs for delivery to Cushing become US$80.06/bbl for SAGD projects, and $89.71/bbl for a standalone mine. In this economic environment, plans for further development of production from oil sands have been slowed or deferred, or even abandoned during construction. Production of synthetic crude from mining operations may continue at a loss because of the costs of shutdown and restart, as well as commitments to supply contracts. During the 2020 Russia–Saudi Arabia oil price war, the price of Canadian heavy crude dipped below $5 per barrel. In 2025 average full cycle cost dropped to around $42/Bbl (without blending and transportation)

=== Production forecasts ===
Oil sands production forecasts released by the Canadian Association of Petroleum Producers (CAPP), the Alberta Energy Regulator (AER), and the Canadian Energy Research Institute (CERI) are comparable to National Energy Board (NEB) projections, in terms of total bitumen production. None of these forecasts take into account probable international constraints to be imposed on combustion of all hydrocarbons in order to limit global temperature rise, giving rise to a situation denoted by the term "carbon bubble". Ignoring such constraints, and also assuming that the price of oil recovers from its collapse in late 2014, the list of currently proposed projects, many of which are in the early planning stages, would suggest that by 2035 Canadian bitumen production could potentially reach as much as 1.3 million m^{3}/d (8.3 million barrels per day) if most were to go ahead. Under the same assumptions, a more likely scenario is that by 2035, Canadian oil sands bitumen production would reach 800,000 m^{3}/d (5.0 million barrels/day), 2.6 times the production for 2012. The majority of the growth would likely occur in the in-situ category, as in-situ projects usually have better economics than mining projects. Also, 80% of Canada's oil sands reserves are well-suited to in-situ extraction, versus 20% for mining methods.

An additional assumption is that there would be sufficient pipeline infrastructure to deliver increased Canadian oil production to export markets. If this were a limiting factor, there could be impacts on Canadian crude oil prices, constraining future production growth. Another assumption is that US markets will continue to absorb increased Canadian exports. Rapid growth of tight oil production in the US, Canada's primary oil export market, has greatly reduced US reliance on imported crude. The potential for Canadian oil exports to alternative markets such as Asia is also uncertain. There are increasing political obstacles to building any new pipelines to deliver oil in Canada and the US. In November 2015, U.S. President Barack Obama rejected the proposal to build the Keystone XL pipeline from Alberta to Steele City, Nebraska. In the absence of new pipeline capacity, companies are increasingly shipping bitumen to US markets by railway, river barge, tanker, and other transportation methods. Other than ocean tankers, these alternatives are all more expensive than pipelines.

A shortage of skilled workers in the Canadian oil sands developed during periods of rapid development of new projects. In the absence of other constraints on further development, the oil and gas industry would need to fill tens of thousands of job openings in the next few years as a result of industry activity levels as well as age-related attrition. In the longer term, under a scenario of higher oil and gas prices, the labor shortages would continue to get worse. A potential labor shortage can increase construction costs and slow the pace of oil sands development.

The skilled worker shortage was much more severe in Venezuela because the government controlled oil company PDVSA fired most of its heavy oil experts after the Venezuelan general strike of 2002–03, and wound down the production of Orimulsion, which was the primary product from its oil sands. Following that, the government re-nationalized the Venezuelan oil industry and increased taxes on it. The result was that foreign companies left Venezuela, as did most of its elite heavy oil technical experts. In recent years, Venezuela's heavy oil production has been falling, and it has consistently been failing to meet its production targets.

As of late 2015, development of new oil sand projects were deterred by the price of WTI below US$50, which is barely enough to support production from existing operations. Demand recovery was suppressed by economic problems that may continue indefinitely to bedevil both the European Community and China. Low-cost production by OPEC continued at maximum capacity, efficiency of production from U.S. shales continued to improve, and Russian exports were mandated even below cost of production, as their only source of hard currency. There is also the possibility that there will emerge an international agreement to introduce measures to constrain the combustion of hydrocarbons in an effort to limit global temperature rise to the nominal 2 °C that is consensually predicted to limit environmental harm to tolerable levels. Rapid technological progress is being made to reduce the cost of competing renewable sources of energy. Hence there is no consensus about when, if ever, oil prices paid to producers may substantially recover.

A detailed academic study of the consequences for the producers of the various hydrocarbon fuels concluded in early 2015 that a third of global oil reserves, half of gas reserves and over 80% of current coal reserves should remain underground from 2010 to 2050 in order to meet the target of 2 °C. Hence continued exploration or development of reserves would be extraneous to needs. To meet the 2 °C target, strong measures would be needed to suppress demand, such as a substantial carbon tax leaving a lower price for the producers from a smaller market. The impact on producers in Canada would be far larger than in the U.S. Open-pit mining of natural bitumen in Canada would soon drop to negligible levels after 2020 in all scenarios considered because it is considerably less economic than other methods of production.

== Environmental issues ==
Satellite images show the growth of pit mines over Canada's oil sands between 1984 and 2011.

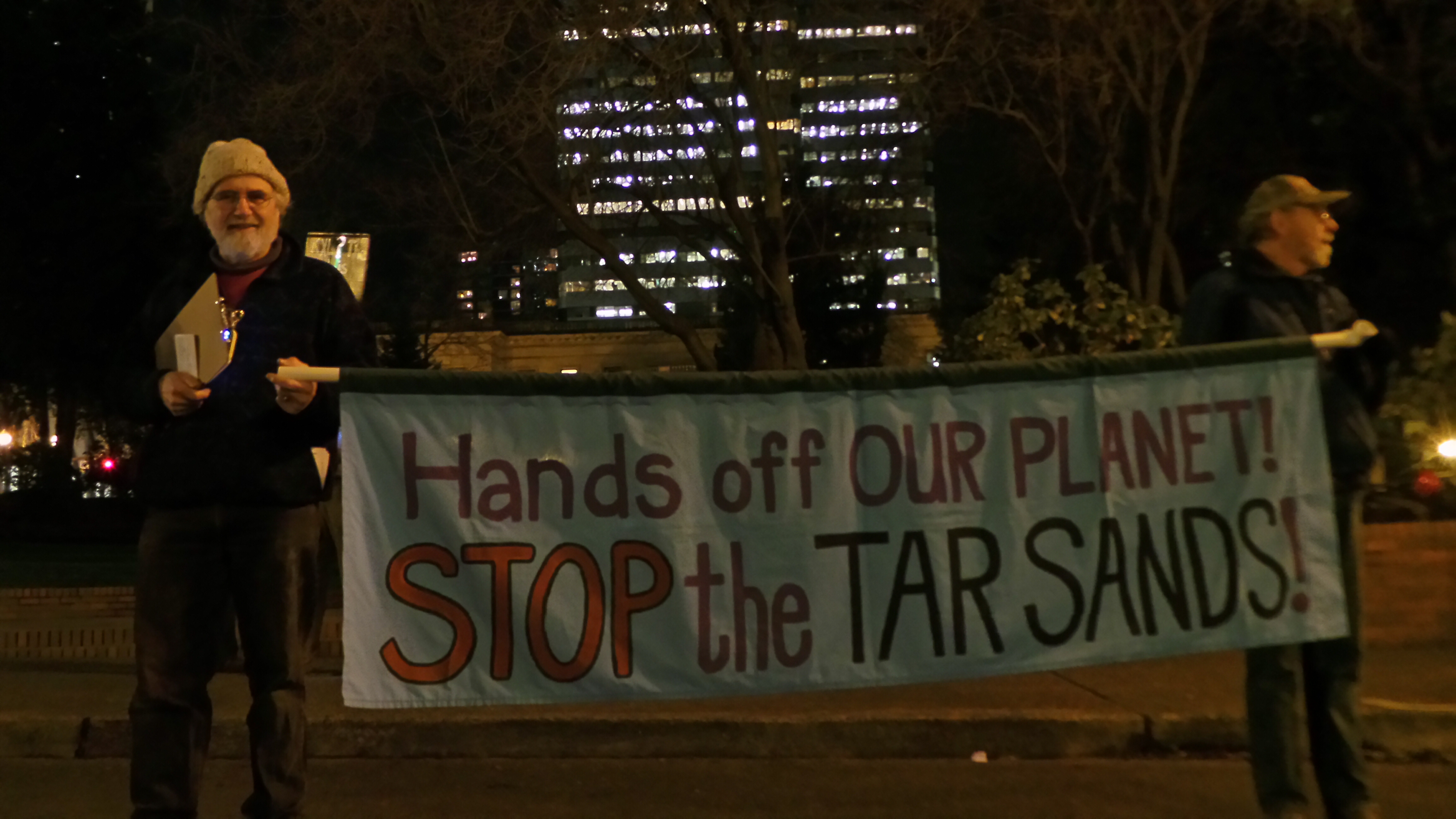
Demonstration of citizens against tar sands and the Keystone Pipeline.

In their 2011 commissioned report entitled "Prudent Development: Realizing the Potential of North America's Abundant Natural Gas and Oil Resources," the National Petroleum Council, an advisory committee to the U.S. Secretary of Energy, acknowledged health and safety concerns regarding the oil sands which include "volumes of water needed to generate issues of water sourcing; removal of overburden for surface mining can fragment wildlife habitat and increase the risk of soil erosion or surface run-off events to nearby water systems; GHG and other air emissions from production."

Oil sands extraction can affect the land when the bitumen is initially mined, water resources by its requirement for large quantities of water during separation of the oil and sand, and the air due to the release of carbon dioxide and other emissions. Heavy metals such as vanadium, nickel, lead, cobalt, mercury, chromium, cadmium, arsenic, selenium, copper, manganese, iron and zinc are naturally present in oil sands and may be concentrated by the extraction process. The environmental impact caused by oil sand extraction is frequently criticized by environmental groups such as Greenpeace, Climate Reality Project, Pembina Institute, 350.org, MoveOn.org, League of Conservation Voters, Patagonia, Sierra Club, and Energy Action Coalition. In particular, mercury contamination has been found around oil sands production in Alberta, Canada. The European Union has indicated that it may vote to label oil sands oil as "highly polluting". Although oil sands exports to Europe are minimal, the issue has caused friction between the EU and Canada. According to the California-based Jacobs Consultancy, the European Union used inaccurate and incomplete data in assigning a high greenhouse gas rating to gasoline derived from Alberta's oilsands. Also, Iran, Saudi Arabia, Nigeria and Russia do not provide data on how much natural gas is released via flaring or venting in the oil extraction process. The Jacobs report pointed out that extra carbon emissions from oil-sand crude are 12 percent higher than from regular crude, although it was assigned a GHG rating 22% above the conventional benchmark by EU.

In 2014 results of a study published in the Proceedings of the National Academy of Sciences showed that official reports on emissions were not high enough. Report authors noted that, "emissions of organic substances with potential toxicity to humans and the environment are a major concern surrounding the rapid industrial development in the Athabasca oil sands region (AOSR)." This study found that tailings ponds were an indirect pathway transporting uncontrolled releases of evaporative emissions of three representative polycyclic aromatic hydrocarbon (PAH)s (phenanthrene, pyrene, and benzo(a)pyrene) and that these emissions had been previously unreported.

=== Air pollution management ===
The Alberta government computes an Air Quality Health Index (AQHI) from sensors in five communities in the oil sands region, operated by a "partner" called the Wood Buffalo Environmental Association (WBEA). Each of their 17 continuously monitoring stations measure 3 to 10 air quality parameters among carbon monoxide (CO), hydrogen sulfide (H_{2}S), total reduced sulfur (TRS), Ammonia (NH_{3}), nitric oxide (NO), nitrogen dioxide (NO_{2}), nitrogen oxides (NO_{x}), ozone (O_{3}), particulate matter (PM2.5), sulfur dioxide (SO_{2}), total hydrocarbons (THC), and methane/non-methane hydrocarbons (CH_{4}/NMHC). These AQHI are said to indicate "low risk" air quality more than 95% of the time. Prior to 2012, air monitoring showed significant increases in exceedances of hydrogen sulfide (H_{2}S) both in the Fort McMurray area and near the oil sands upgraders. In 2007, the Alberta government issued an environmental protection order to Suncor in response to numerous occasions when ground level concentration for H_{2}S) exceeded standards. The Alberta Ambient Air Data Management System (AAADMS) of the Clean Air Strategic Alliance (aka CASA Data Warehouse) records that, during the year ending on 1 November 2015, there were 6 hourly reports of values exceeding the limit of 10 ppb for H_{2}S, and 4 in 2013, down from 11 in 2014, and 73 in 2012.

In September 2015, the Pembina Institute published a brief report about "a recent surge of odour and air quality concerns in northern Alberta associated with the expansion of oilsands development", contrasting the responses to these concerns in Peace River and Fort McKay. In Fort McKay, air quality is actively addressed by stakeholders represented in the WBEA, whereas the Peace River community must rely on the response of the Alberta Energy Regulator. In an effort to identify the sources of the noxious odours in the Fort McKay community, a Fort McKay Air Quality Index was established, extending the provincial Air Quality Health Index to include possible contributors to the problem: SO_{2}, TRS, and THC. Despite these advantages, more progress was made in remediating the odour problems in the Peace River community, although only after some families had already abandoned their homes. The odour concerns in Fort McKay were reported to remain unresolved.

=== Land use and waste management ===
A large part of oil sands mining operations involves clearing trees and brush from a site and removing the overburden—topsoil, muskeg, sand, clay and gravel—that sits atop the oil sands deposit. Approximately 2.5 tons of oil sands are needed to produce one barrel of oil (roughly 1/8 of a ton). As a condition of licensing, projects are required to implement a reclamation plan. The mining industry asserts that the boreal forest will eventually colonize the reclaimed lands, but their operations are massive and work on long-term timeframes. As of 2013, about 715 square kilometres (276 sq mi) of land in the oil sands region have been disturbed, and 72 km^{2} (28 sq mi) of that land is under reclamation. In March 2008, Alberta issued the first-ever oil sands land reclamation certificate to Syncrude for the 1.04 square kilometres (0.40 sq mi) parcel of land known as Gateway Hill approximately 35 kilometres (22 mi) north of Fort McMurray. Several reclamation certificate applications for oil sands projects are expected within the next 10 years.

=== Water management ===
Between 2 and 4.5 volume units of water are used to produce each volume unit of synthetic crude oil in an ex-situ mining operation. According to Greenpeace, the Canadian oil sands operations use 349×10^{6} m^{3}/a (12.3×10^{9} cu ft/a) of water, twice the amount of water used by the city of Calgary. However, in SAGD operations, 90–95% of the water is recycled and only about 0.2 volume units of water is used per volume unit of bitumen produced.

For the Athabasca oil sand operations water is supplied from the Athabasca River, the ninth longest river in Canada. The average flow just downstream of Fort McMurray is 633 m^{3}/s (22,400 cu ft/s) with its highest daily average measuring 1,200 m^{3}/s (42,000 cu ft/s). Oil sands industries water license allocations totals about 1.8% of the Athabasca river flow. Actual use in 2006 was about 0.4%. In addition, according to the Water Management Framework for the Lower Athabasca River, during periods of low river flow water consumption from the Athabasca River is limited to 1.3% of annual average flow.

In December 2010, the Oil Sands Advisory Panel, commissioned by former environment minister Jim Prentice, found that the system in place for monitoring water quality in the region, including work by the Regional Aquatic Monitoring Program, the Alberta Water Research Institute, the Cumulative Environmental Management Association and others, was piecemeal and should become more comprehensive and coordinated.

=== Greenhouse gas emissions ===
The production of bitumen and synthetic crude oil emits more greenhouse gases than the production of conventional crude oil. A 2009 study by the consulting firm IHS CERA estimated that production from Canada's oil sands emits "about 5% to 15% more carbon dioxide, over the "well-to-wheels" (WTW) lifetime analysis of the fuel, than average crude oil." Author and investigative journalist David Strahan that same year stated that IEA figures show that carbon dioxide emissions from the oil sands are 20% higher than average emissions from the petroleum production.

A Stanford University study commissioned by the EU in 2011 found that oil sands crude was as much as 22% more carbon-intensive than other fuels. According to the "Carnegie Endowment for International Peace" analysis, oil sands emit 31% more GHG that the average North American crude oil. In 2023 a federal study found that the real emissions from oil sands are 65% higher than reported by the industry.

Greenpeace says the oil sands industry has been identified as the largest contributor to greenhouse gas emissions growth in Canada, as it accounts for 40 million tons of CO_{2} emissions per year.

According to the Canadian Association of Petroleum Producers and Environment Canada the industrial activity undertaken to produce oil sands make up about 5% of Canada's greenhouse gas emissions, or 0.1% of global greenhouse gas emissions. It predicts the oil sands will grow to make up 8% of Canada's greenhouse gas emissions by 2015. While the production industrial activity emissions per barrel of bitumen produced decreased 26% over the decade 1992–2002, total emissions from production activity were expected to increase due to higher production levels. As of 2006, to produce one barrel of oil from the oil sands released almost 75 kilograms (165 lb) of greenhouse gases with total emissions estimated to be 67 megatonnes (66,000,000 long tons; 74,000,000 short tons) per year by 2015. A study by IHS CERA found that fuels made from Canadian oil sands resulted in significantly lower greenhouse gas emissions than many commonly cited estimates. A 2012 study by Swart and Weaver estimated that if only the economically viable reserve of 170 Gbbl (27×10^{9} m^{3}) oil sands was burnt, the global mean temperature would increase by 0.02 to 0.05 °C. If the entire oil-in-place of 1.8 trillion barrels were to be burnt, the predicted global mean temperature increase is 0.24 to 0.50 °C. Bergerson et al. found that while the WTW emissions can be higher than crude oil, the lower emitting oil sands cases can outperform higher emitting conventional crude cases.

To offset greenhouse gas emissions from the oil sands and elsewhere in Alberta, sequestering carbon dioxide emissions inside depleted oil and gas reservoirs has been proposed. This technology is inherited from enhanced oil recovery methods. In July 2008, the Alberta government announced a C$2 billion fund to support sequestration projects in Alberta power plants and oil sands extraction and upgrading facilities.

In 2014, the U.S. Congressional Research Service published a report in preparation for the decision about permitting construction of the Keystone XL pipeline. The report states in part: "Canadian oil sands crudes are generally more GHG emission-intensive than other crudes they may displace in U.S. refineries, and emit an estimated 17% more GHGs on a life-cycle basis than the average barrel of crude oil refined in the United States".

According to Natural Resources Canada (NRCan), by 2017, the 23 percent increase in GHG emissions in Canada from 2005 to 2017, was "largely from increased oil sands production, particularly in-situ extraction".

=== Aquatic life deformities ===
There is conflicting research on the effects of the oil sands development on aquatic life. In 2007, Environment Canada completed a study that shows high deformity rates in fish embryos exposed to the oil sands. David W. Schindler, a limnologist from the University of Alberta, co-authored a study on Alberta's oil sands' contribution of aromatic polycyclic compounds, some of which are known carcinogens, to the Athabasca River and its tributaries. Scientists, local doctors, and residents supported a letter sent to the Prime Minister in September 2010 calling for an independent study of Lake Athabasca (which is downstream of the oil sands) to be initiated due to the rise of deformities and tumors found in fish caught there.

The bulk of the research that defends the oil sands development is done by the Regional Aquatics Monitoring Program (RAMP), whose steering committee is composed largely of oil and gas companies. RAMP studies show that deformity rates are normal compared to historical data and the deformity rates in rivers upstream of the oil sands.

=== Public health impacts ===
In 2007, it was suggested that wildlife has been negatively affected by the oil sands; for instance, moose were found in a 2006 study to have as high as 453 times the acceptable levels of arsenic in their systems, though later studies lowered this to 17 to 33 times the acceptable level (although below international thresholds for consumption).

Concerns have been raised concerning the negative impacts that the oil sands have on public health, including higher than normal rates of cancer among residents of Fort Chipewyan. However, John O'Connor, the doctor who initially reported the higher cancer rates and linked them to the oil sands development, was subsequently investigated by the Alberta College of Physicians and Surgeons. The College later reported that O'Connor's statements consisted of "mistruths, inaccuracies and unconfirmed information".

In 2010, the Royal Society of Canada released a report stating that "there is currently no credible evidence of environmental contaminant exposures from oil sands reaching Fort Chipewyan at levels expected to cause elevated human cancer rates."

In August 2011, the Alberta government initiated a provincial health study to examine whether a link exists between the higher rates of cancer and the oil sands emissions.

In a report released in 2014, Alberta's Chief Medical Officer of Health, Dr. James Talbot, stated that "There isn't strong evidence for an association between any of these cancers and environmental exposure to oil sands." Rather, Talbot suggested that the cancer rates at Fort Chipewyan, which were slightly higher compared with the provincial average, were likely due to a combination of factors such as high rates of smoking, obesity, diabetes, and alcoholism as well as poor levels of vaccination.

== See also ==
- Athabasca oil sands
- Beaver River sandstone
- Cold Lake oil sands
- History of the petroleum industry in Canada (oil sands and heavy oil)
- Melville Island oil sands
- Oil megaprojects
- Oil shale
- Organic-rich sedimentary rocks
- Orinoco Belt
- Peace River oil sands
- Petroleum industry
- Project Oilsand
- Pyrobitumen
- RAVEN (Respecting Aboriginal Values & Environmental Needs)
- Shale gas
- Steam injection (oil industry)
- Stranded asset
- Thermal depolymerization
- Utah oil sands
- Wabasca oil field
- World energy consumption
- Asphalt concrete
