= Athabasca oil sands =

Oil and bitumen deposits in Alberta, Canada

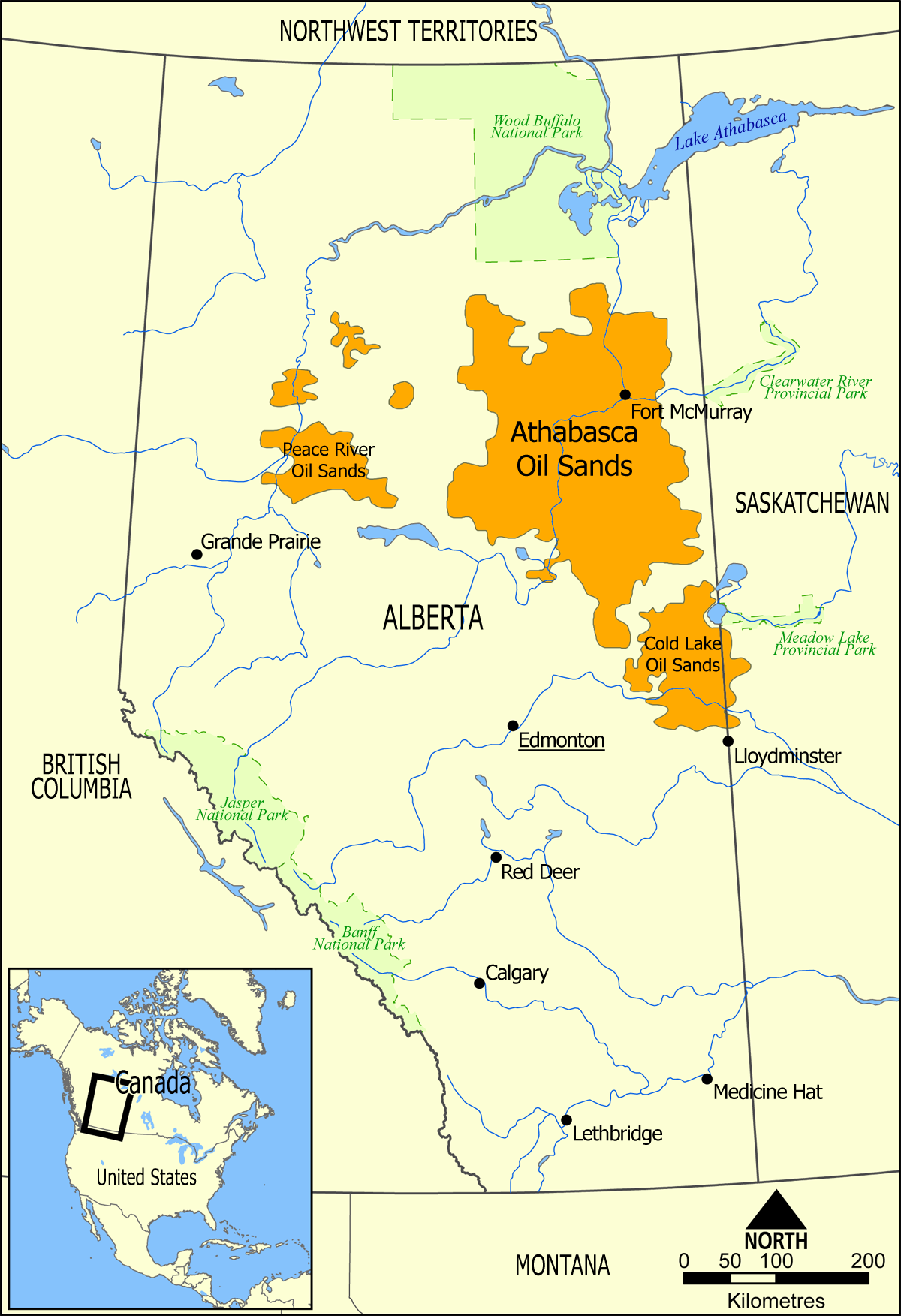
- Country: Canada
- Region: Northern Alberta
- Offshore/onshore: Onshore, mining
- Coordinates: 57.02°N 111.65°W
- Operators: Syncrude, Suncor Energy, Canadian Natural Resources, TotalEnergies, Imperial Oil, Petro Canada, Devon Energy, Husky Energy, Statoil, Nexen
- Partners: Chevron Corporation, Marathon Oil, ConocoPhillips, BP, Occidental Petroleum

Field history
- Discovery: 1848
- Start of production: 1967

Production
- Current production of oil: 2,800,000 barrels per day (~1.4×10^{8} t/a)
- Estimated oil in place: 133,000 million barrels (~1.81×10^{10} t)
- Producing formations: McMurray, Clearwater, Grand Rapids

The Athabasca oil sands, also known as the Athabasca tar sands, are large deposits of oil sands rich in bitumen, a heavy and viscous form of petroleum, in northeastern Alberta, Canada. These reserves are one of the largest sources of unconventional oil in the world, making Canada a significant player in the global energy market.

As of 2023, Canada's oil sands industry, along with Western Canada and offshore petroleum facilities near Newfoundland and Labrador, continued to increase production and were projected to increase by an estimated 10% in 2024 representing a potential record high at the end of the year of approximately 5.3 million barrels per day (bpd). The surge in production is attributed mainly to growth in Alberta's oilsands. The expansion of the Trans Mountain pipeline—the only oil pipeline to the West Coast—will further facilitate this increase, with its capacity set to increase significantly, to 890,000 barrels per day from 300,000 bpd currently. Despite this growth, there are warnings that it might be short-lived, with production potentially plateauing after 2024. Canada's anticipated increase in oil output exceeds that of other major producers like the United States, and the country is poised to become a significant driver of global crude oil production growth in 2024. The exploitation of these resources has stirred debates regarding economic development, energy security, and environmental impacts, particularly emissions from the oilsands, prompting discussions around emissions regulations for the oil and gas sector.

The Athabasca oil sands, along with the nearby Peace River and Cold Lake deposits oil sand deposits lie under 141,000 square kilometres (54,000 sq mi) of boreal forest and muskeg (peat bogs) according to Government of Alberta's Ministry of Energy, Alberta Energy Regulator (AER) and the Canadian Association of Petroleum Producers (CAPP).

== History ==
The Athabasca oil sands are named after the Athabasca River which cuts through the heart of the deposit, and traces of the heavy oil are readily observed on the river banks. Historically, the bitumen was used by the indigenous Cree and Dene Aboriginal peoples to waterproof their canoes. The oil deposits are located within the boundaries of Treaty 8, and several First Nations of the area are involved with the sands.

=== Early history ===
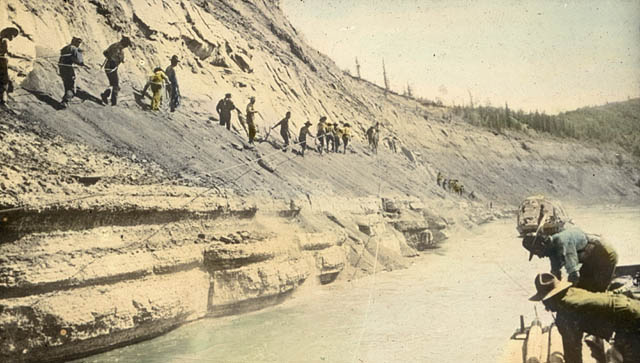
Athabasca oil sands on the banks of the river, around 1900

The Athabasca oil sands first came to the attention of European fur traders in 1719 when Wa-pa-su, a Cree trader, brought a sample of bituminous sands to the Hudson's Bay Company post at York Factory on Hudson Bay where Henry Kelsey was the manager. In 1778, Peter Pond, another fur trader and a founder of the rival North West Company, became the first European to see the Athabasca deposits after exploring the Methye Portage which allowed access to the rich fur resources of the Athabasca River system from the Hudson Bay watershed.

In 1788, fur trader Alexander Mackenzie, after whom the Mackenzie River was later named, traveled along routes to both the Arctic and Pacific Ocean wrote: "At about 24 miles [39 km] from the fork (of the Athabasca and Clearwater Rivers) are some bituminous fountains into which a pole of 20 feet [6.1 m] long may be inserted without the least resistance. The bitumen is in a fluid state and when mixed with gum, the resinous substance collected from the spruce fir, it serves to gum the Indians' canoes." He was followed in 1799 by mapmaker David Thompson and in 1819 by British Naval officer John Franklin.

John Richardson did the first serious scientific assessment of the oil sands in 1848 on his way north to search for Franklin's lost expedition. The first government-sponsored survey of the oil sands was initiated in 1875 by John Macoun, and in 1883, G. C. Hoffman of the Geological Survey of Canada tried separating the bitumen from oil sand with the use of water and reported that it separated readily. In 1888, Robert Bell, the director of the Geological Survey of Canada, reported to a Senate Committee that "The evidence ... points to the existence in the Athabasca and Mackenzie valleys of the most extensive petroleum field in America, if not the world."

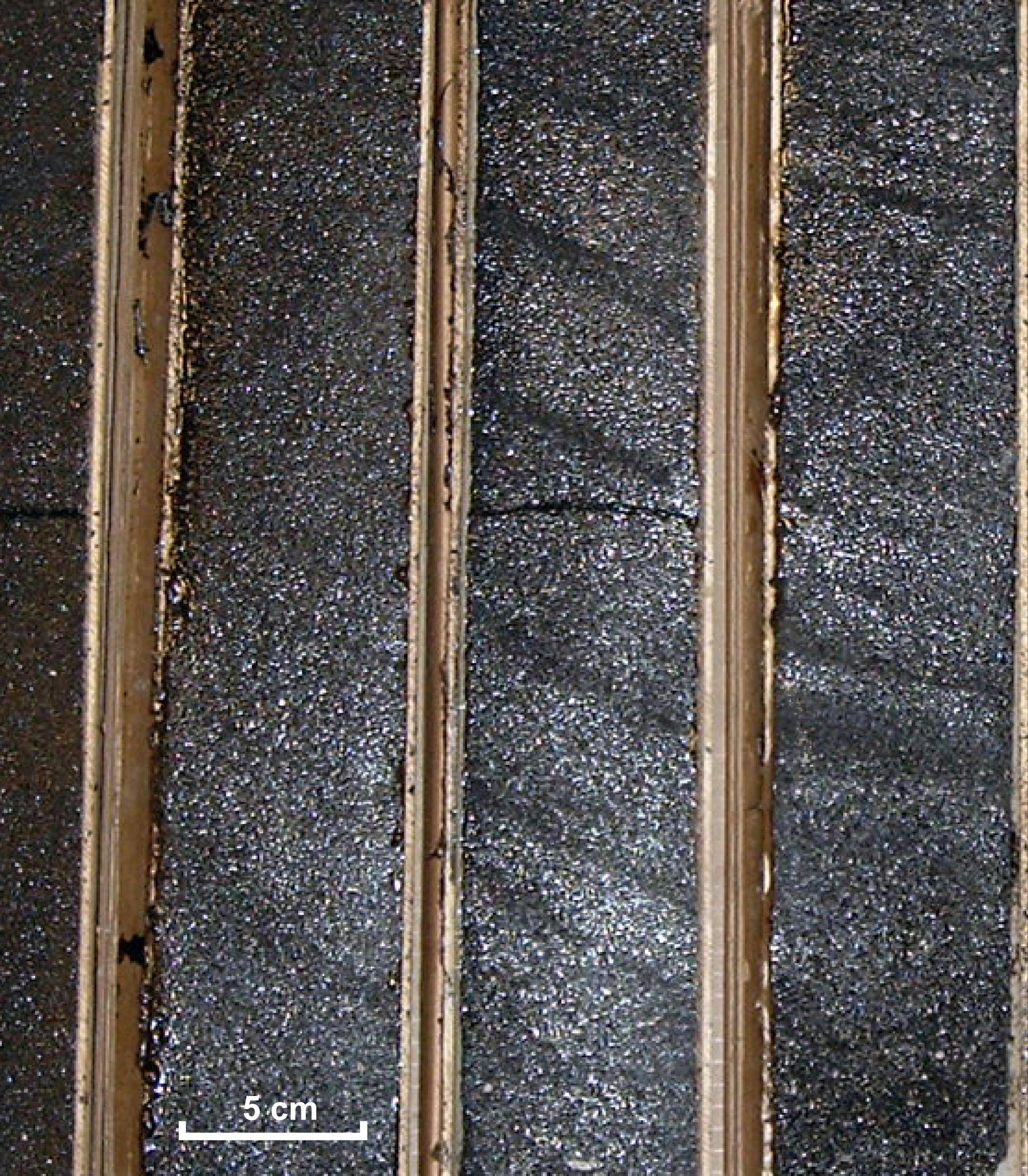
Athabasca oil sand of the McMurray Formation as seen in drill cores.

Count Alfred von Hammerstein (1870–1941), who arrived in the region in 1897, promoted the Athabasca oil sands for over forty years, taking photos with descriptive titles such as "Tar Sands and Flowing Asphaltum in the Athabasca District," that are now in the National Library and National Archives Canada. Photos of the Athabasca oil sands were also featured in Canadian writer and adventurer, Agnes Deans Cameron's, best-selling book The New North which recounted her 10,000 mi (16,000 km) roundtrip to the Arctic Ocean. Her photographs were reproduced in 2011–2012 in an exhibit at the Canadian Museum of Civilization in Ottawa, and included photos of Count Alfred Von Hammerstein's oil drill works along the Athabasca River.

In 1926, Karl Clark of the University of Alberta received a patent for a hot water separation process which was the forerunner of today's thermal extraction processes. Several attempts to implement it had varying degrees of success.

=== Project Oilsand ===
Project Oilsand was a 1958 proposal to exploit the Athabasca oil sands using the underground detonation of nuclear explosives; hypothetically, the heat and pressure created by an underground detonation would boil the bitumen deposits, reducing their viscosity to the point that standard oilfield techniques could be used. The plan was discussed in the October 1976 Bulletin of the Atomic Scientists. A patent was granted for the intended process in 1964. The nuclear heating option is considered a forerunner to some of the conventional heating methods used to extract tar sands oil.

In April 1959, the Federal Mines Department approved Project Oilsand. However, it was subsequently cancelled in 1962.

=== Great Canadian Oil Sands ===
The oil sands, which are typically 40 to 60 metres (130 to 200 ft) thick and sit on top of relatively flat limestone, are relatively easy to access. They lie under 1 to 3 m (3 ft 3 in to 9 ft 10 in) of waterlogged muskeg, 0 to 75 metres (0 to 246 ft) of clay and barren sand. As a result of the easy accessibility, the world's first oil-sands mine was in the Athabasca oil sands.

Commercial production of oil from the Athabasca oil sands began in 1967, with the opening of the Great Canadian Oil Sands (GCOS) plant in Fort McMurray. It was the first operational oil sands project in the world, owned and operated by the American parent company, Sun Oil Company. When the US$240 million plant officially opened with a capacity of 45,000 barrels per day (7,200 m^{3}/d), it marked the beginning of commercial development of the Athabasca oil sands. In 2013 McKenzie-Brown listed industrialist J. Howard Pew as one of the six visionaries who built the Athabasca oil sands. By the time of his death in 1971, the Pew family were ranked by Forbes magazine as one of the half-dozen wealthiest families in America. The Great Canadian Oil Sands Limited (then a subsidiary of Sun Oil Company but now incorporated into an independent company known as Suncor Energy Inc.) produced 30,000 barrels per day (4,800 m^{3}/d) of synthetic crude oil.

=== Oil crisis ===
The true size of the Canadian oil sands deposits became known in the 1970s. The Syncrude mine is now the largest mine (by area) in the world, with mines potentially covering 140,000 km^{2} (54,000 sq mi). (Although there is oil underlying 142,200 km^{2} (54,900 sq mi), which may be disturbed by drilling and in situ extraction, only 4,800 km^{2} (1,900 sq mi) may potentially be surface mined, and 904 km^{2} (349 sq mi) has to date been mined.)

Development was inhibited by declining world oil prices, and the second mine, operated by the Syncrude consortium, did not begin operating until 1978, after the 1973 oil crisis sparked investor interest. However, the price of oil subsided afterwards and although the 1979 energy crisis caused oil prices to peak again, during the 1980s, oil prices declined to very low levels causing considerable retrenchment in the oil industry.

In 1979, Sun formed Suncor by merging its Canadian refining and retailing interests with Great Canadian Oil Sands and its conventional oil and gas interests. In 1981, the Government of Ontario purchased a 25% stake in the company but divested it in 1993. In 1995, Sun Oil also divested its interest in the company, although Suncor maintained the Sunoco retail brand in Canada. Suncor took advantage of these two divestitures to become an independent, widely held public company.

Suncor continued to grow and continued to produce more and more oil from its oil sands operations regardless of fluctuating market prices, and eventually became bigger than its former parent company. In 2009, Suncor acquired the formerly Canadian government owned oil company, Petro-Canada, which turned Suncor into the largest petroleum company in Canada and one of the biggest Canadian companies. Suncor Energy is now a Canadian company completely unaffiliated with its former American parent company. Sun Oil Company became known as Sunoco, but later left the oil production and refining business, and has since become a retail gasoline distributor owned by Energy Transfer Partners of Dallas, Texas. In Canada, Suncor Energy converted all of its Sunoco stations (which were all in Ontario) to Petro-Canada sites in order to unify all of its downstream retail operations under the Petro-Canada banner and discontinue paying licensing fees for the Sunoco brand. Nationwide, Petro-Canada's upstream product supplier and parent company is Suncor Energy. Suncor Energy continues to operate just one Sunoco retail site in Ontario.

== Oil sands production in the 21st century ==
At the turn of the 21st century, oil sands development in Canada started to take off, with an expansion at the Suncor mine, a new mine and expansion at Syncrude, and a new mine by Royal Dutch Shell associated with their new Scotford Upgrader near Edmonton. Three new large steam-assisted gravity drainage (SAGD) projects were added – Foster Creek, Surmont, and MacKay River – by different companies, all of which have since been bought by larger companies.

Shell Canada's third mine began operating in 2003. However, as a result of oil price increases since 2003, the existing mines have been greatly expanded and new ones were built.

According to the Alberta Energy and Utilities Board, 2005 production of crude bitumen in the Athabasca oil sands was as follows:

2005 production of crude bitumen
Mine	(m^{3}/day)	Barrels per day
Suncor mine	31,000	195,000
Syncrude mine	41,700	262,000
Shell Canada mine	26,800	169,000
In situ projects	21,300	134,000
Total	120,800	760,000

As of 2006, oil sands production had increased to 1,126,000 barrels per day (179,000 m^{3}/d). Oil sands were by then the source of 62% of Alberta's total oil production and 47% of all oil produced in Canada. As of 2010, oil sands production had increased to over 1.6 million barrels per day (250,000 m^{3}/d) to exceed conventional oil production in Canada. 53% of this was produced by surface mining and 47% by in-situ techniques. In 2012, oil production from oil sands was 1.8 million barrels per day (290,000 m^{3}/d).

=== Shale oil boom ===
The massive development of tight oil extraction in the Bakken and Permian Basin in the United States transformed the oil industry rapidly, reducing importation of foreign oil dramatically. As with the oil sands, production costs of shale oil are higher than those of conventional oil. A combination of factors, among them oversupply and geopolitical rivalries, drove the price of oil down from more than 100 dollars a barrel in 2013 to less than 40 dollars three years later. Lingering low oil prices prompted companies to cancel new investments in the oil sands.

=== Fort McMurray wildfire ===
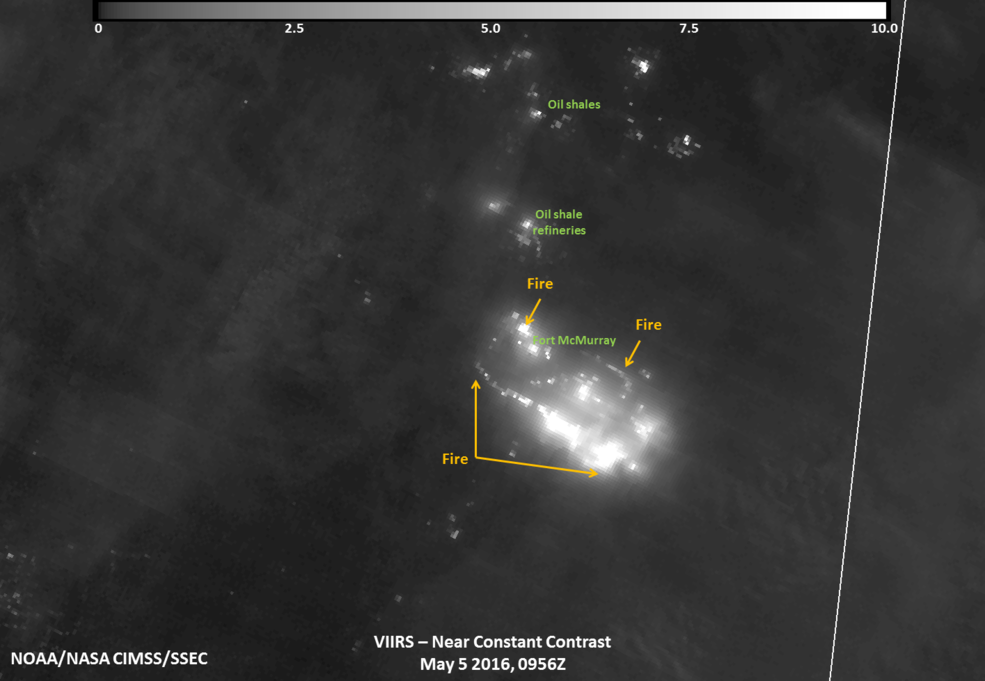
Satellite image of the fire at night (May 5, 2016).

From May to July 2016, a wildfire spread from Fort McMurray across northern Alberta, burning approximately 590,000 hectares (1,500,000 acres) of forested areas and destroying approximately 2,400 homes and buildings. 88,000 people were forced from their homes in what became the largest wildfire evacuation in Alberta's history and the costliest disaster in Canadian history.

The wildfire halted oil sands production at facilities north of Fort McMurray. Shell Canada shut down output at its Albian Sands mining operation. Suncor Energy and Syncrude Canada also scaled back operations and evacuated employees and their families. Approximately one million barrels of oil a day, equal to a quarter of Canada's oil production, was halted as a result of the fire in May. This continued into June at a rate of 700,000 barrels per day. The lost output was a contributing factor to rises in global oil prices. The scaled back operations, along with a refinery outage in Edmonton, caused many gas stations to run out of gas throughout Western Canada.

2015 production of crude bitumen
Mine	(m^{3}/day)	Barrels per day
Suncor mine	80,000	501,000
Syncrude mine	65,000	407,000
Shell Canada mines	40,000	255,000
Imperial Oil mine	35,000	220,000
CNRL mine	24,000	152,000
In situ projects	138,000	865,000
Total	382,000	2,400,000

In 2018, oil sands production reached 3.1 million barrels per day (490,000 m^{3}/d).

Until 2014, industry groups believed oil sands production levels could reach 5 Mbbl/d (790,000 m^{3}/d) by 2030. As of 2021, after a slowdown in investment, analyst are predicting it could reach 3.8 Mbbl/d (600,000 m^{3}/d) by that time.

=== Transportation ===
Canada is the largest source of oil imported by the United States, supplying 3 million barrels per day (480,000 m^{3}/d) chiefly from oil sands sources as of 2019.

Industry observers went from believing there might be excess pipeline capacity to warning that it was insufficient to accommodate oil sands production growth, after several pipeline projects were abandoned or cancelled.

The North Gateway project to Kitimat, British Columbia, which would have been built by Enbridge, operator of the Enbridge Pipeline System which also serves the area, was cancelled in 2016. Similarly, after lengthy environmentalist and First Nation group opposition, Keystone XL, a pipeline project from Alberta to Gulf coast refineries, was cancelled in 2021. Other projects, using existing rights of way, are being built, like Kinder Morgan's Trans Mountain Expansion, nationalized in 2018, or Enbridge's Line 9, reversed to feed refineries in Quebec. Between January 2019 and December 2020, the Alberta government imposed a quota to adjust production to pipeline export capacity.

To compensate for pipeline capacity limitations, shipment of oil by rail increased from less than 50 thousand to 400 thousand barrels per day (64,000 m^{3}/d) between 2012 and 2020.

== Future production ==
As of December 2008, the Canadian Association of Petroleum Producers revised its 2008–2020 crude oil forecasts to account for project cancellations and cutbacks as a result of the price declines in the second half of 2008. The revised forecast predicted that Canadian oil sands production would continue to grow, but at a slower rate than previously predicted. There would be minimal changes to 2008–2012 production, but by 2020 production could be 300,000 barrels per day (48,000 m^{3}/d) less than its prior predictions. This would mean that Canadian oil sands production would grow from 1.2 million barrels per day (190,000 m^{3}/d) in 2008 to 3.3 million barrels per day (520,000 m^{3}/d) in 2020, and that total Canadian oil production would grow from 2.7 to 4.1 million barrels per day (430,000 to 650,000 m^{3}/d) in 2020. Even accounting for project cancellations, this would place Canada among the four or five largest oil-producing countries in the world by 2020.

In early December 2007, London-based BP and Calgary-based Husky Energy announced a 50–50 joint venture to produce and refine bitumen from the Athabasca oil sands. BP would contribute its Toledo, Ohio refinery to the joint venture, while Husky would contribute its Sunrise oil sands project. Sunrise was planned to start producing 60,000 barrels per day (9,500 m^{3}/d) of bitumen in 2012 and may reach 200,000 bbl/d (32,000 m^{3}/d) by 2015–2020. BP would modify its Toledo refinery to process 170,000 bbl/d (27,000 m^{3}/d) of bitumen directly to refined products. The joint venture would solve problems for both companies, since Husky was short of refining capacity, and BP had no presence in the oil sands. It was a change of strategy for BP, since the company historically has downplayed the importance of oil sands.

In mid December 2007, ConocoPhillips announced its intention to increase its oil sands production from 60,000 barrels per day (9,500 m^{3}/d) to 1 million barrels per day (160,000 m^{3}/d) over the next 20 years, which would make it the largest private sector oil sands producer in the world. ConocoPhillips currently holds the largest position in the Canadian oil sands with over 1 million acres (4,000 km^{2}) under lease. Other major oil sands producers planning to increase their production include Royal Dutch Shell (to 770,000 bbl/d (122,000 m^{3}/d)); Syncrude Canada (to 550,000 bbl/d (87,000 m^{3}/d)); Suncor Energy (to 500,000 bbl/d (79,000 m^{3}/d)) and Canadian Natural Resources (to 500,000 bbl/d (79,000 m^{3}/d)). If all these plans come to fruition, these five companies will be producing over 3.3 Mbbl/d (520,000 m^{3}/d) of oil from oil sands by 2028.

Operating and Approved Athabasca Oil Sands Projects (as of December 2016)
Project name	Type	Major partners	National affiliation	2016 production (barrels/day)	Planned production (barrels/day)
Millenium	Mining	Suncor Energy	Canada	501,000	501,000
Fort Hills	Mining	Suncor Energy	Canada	—	180,000
Firebag	SAGD	Suncor Energy	Canada	273,000	398,000
MacKay River	SAGD	Suncor Energy	Canada	38,000	58,000
Mildred Lake, Aurora	Mining	Suncor (60%), Imperial Oil (25%), Sinopec (9%), CNOOC (7%) (Syncrude)	Canada, China, USA	407,000	607,000
Jackpine, Muskeg	Mining	Shell (10%), Chevron (20%), CNRL (70%) (Albian Sands)	Canada, UK/Netherlands, USA	255,000	570,000
Kearl	Mining	Imperial Oil (70%), ExxonMobil (30%)	USA	220,000	345,000
Horizon	Mining	Canadian Natural Resources	Canada	197,000	277,000
Jackfish I and II, Pike	SAGD	Canadian Natural Resources	Canada	105,000	175,000
Kirby	SAGD	Canadian Natural Resources	Canada	40,000	140,000
Foster Creek	SAGD	Cenovus Energy	Canada	180,000	260,000
Christina Lake	SAGD	Cenovus Energy	Canada	160,800	310,000
Grand Rapids	SAGD	Cenovus Energy	Canada	10,000	180,000
Narrow Lake	SAGD	Cenovus Energy	Canada	45,000	130,000
Surmont	SAGD	TotalEnergies (50%), ConocoPhillips (50%)	France, USA	149,200	206,000
Long Lake	SAGD	Nexen (65%), OPTI Canada (35%)	China	92,000	129,500
Sunrise	SAGD	Husky Energy (50%), BP (50%)	Canada, UK	60,000	200,000
Christina Lake	SAGD	MEG Energy Corp	Canada, China	60,000	210,000
Mackay River	SAGD	Brion Energy	China	35,000	150,000
Leismer	SAGD	Athabasca Oil Corporation	Canada, China	20,000	60,000
Hangingstone	SAGD	Athabasca Oil Corporation	Canada, China	12,000	12,000
Great Divide	SAGD	Connacher Oil and Gas	Canada	20,000	48,000
Algar Lake	SAGD	Grizzly Oil Sands	Canada	6,000	12,000
West Ells	SAGD	Sunshine Oilsands	China	5,000	10,000
Blackrod	SAGD	BlackPearl Resources	Canada	800	80,000
Germain, Saleski	SAGD	Laricina Energy (60%), OSUM (40%)	Canada	—	270,000
Hangingstone	SAGD	JACOS (75%), CNOOC (25%)	Japan, China	—	20,000
Advanced TriStar	SAGD	Value Creation Inc	Canada	—	60,000
Black Gold	SAGD	Korea National Oil Corporation	South Korea	—	30,000
Hoole	SAGD	Cavalier Energy	Canada	—	10,000
Muskwa	Steam & CO_{2}	Renergy Petroleum	China	—	440
Total				2,891,800	5,638,940

== Governance ==
The governance of the Alberta oil sands is focused on economic development, and has historically been dominated by the interests of two primary actors; government (federal and provincial) and industry. Canadian federalism forms the functions and roles of each level of government, in that constitutional power is split so that neither is superior to the other. The Constitution Act, 1867, Section 109 ensures the province full ownership of the lands and resources within its borders. The province acts as the landowner and the federal government oversees jurisdiction over trade, commerce and taxation. There is a clear overlap, as resource management influences trade, and trade management influences resources. As of the 1990s, both the federal and provincial government have been aligned, focusing on regulation, technology and the development of new export markets. The majority of "ground-level" governance is carried out by a number of provincial institutions.

Ottawa has avoided direct investment, preferring to improve the investment climate. A prime example of this occurred in 1994, when the federal government rolled out tax breaks allowing 100% of oil sands capital investments to be written off as accelerated capital cost allowances. The provincial government had a much more direct role in development; investing directly in numerous pilot projects, undertaking joint ventures with the industry and consistently making massive investments in research and development. Some people have claimed that Alberta features one of the lowest royalty rates in the world. Since Alberta, unlike US states, owns the vast majority of oil under its surface it can exercise more control over it, whereas US states are limited to severance taxes. This industry-centric royalty system has been criticised for "promoting a runaway pace of development".

Industry is the core force of oil sands development. The first major players, Suncor Energy and Syncrude, dominated the market until the 1990s. Currently there are 64 companies operating several hundred projects. The majority of production now comes from foreign-owned corporations, and the maintenance of a favourable climate for these corporations grants them strong influence; much stronger than that of non-productive stakeholders, such as citizens and environmental groups.

Governance (policy, administration, regulation) over the oil sands is held almost entirely by the Ministry of Energy (Alberta) and its various departments. Critics noted a clear and systemic lack of public involvement at all key stages of the governance process. In answer to this, the province initiated the Oil Sands Consultations Multistakeholder Committee (MSC) in 2006. The MSC represents four organisations: the Cumulative Environmental Management Association (CEMA), the Wood Buffalo Environmental Association (WBEA), the Canadian Oil Sands Network for Research and Development (CONRAD) and the Athabasca Regional Issues Working Group (RIWG). The role of the MSC is to consult and make recommendations on management principles. The recommendations contained in the MSC's first 2007 Final Report were lauded by several ministers and government representatives, but none have yet been effectively passed into law.

On October 17, 2012, the Alberta government announced it would follow the recommendations of a working group to develop an agency that would monitor the environmental impact of the oil sands. "The new science-based agency will begin work in the oil sands region and will focus on what is monitored, how it's monitored and where it's monitored. This will include integrated and coordinated monitoring of land, air, water and biodiversity," said a press release from Diana McQueen's office, the Minister of Energy and Sustainable Development. The provincial government moved to develop the agency after widespread public criticism by environmentalists, aboriginal groups and scientists, who claimed the oil sands would have a devastating, long-term effect on the environment if left unchecked.

On June 17, 2013, the newly formed corporation, Alberta Energy Regulator (AER) was phased in with a mandate to regulate oil, gas and coal development in Alberta including the Athabasca oil sands. The AER brings together "the regulatory functions from the Energy Resources Conservation Board and the Alberta Ministry of Environment and Sustainable Resource Development into a one-stop shop" The Alberta Energy Regulator is now "responsible for all projects from application to reclamation." They will respond to project proponents, landowners and industry regarding energy regulations in Alberta. The Responsible Energy Development Act gave the Alberta Energy Regulator "the authority to administer the Public Lands Act, the Environmental Protection and Enhancement Act and the Water Act, with regards to energy development." The Alberta Energy Regulator will enforce environmental laws and issue environmental and water permits, responsibilities formerly the mandate of Alberta Environment.

== Development ==
Map of all pipelines regulated by the Canadian Energy Regulator that originate from Alberta.

The key characteristic of the Athabasca deposit is that it is the only one shallow enough to be suitable for surface mining. About 10% of the Athabasca oil sands are covered by less than 75 metres (246 ft) of overburden. Until 2009, the surface mineable area (SMA) was defined by the ERCB, an agency of the Alberta government, to cover 37 contiguous townships (about 3,400 km^{2} or 1,300 sq mi) north of Fort McMurray. In June 2009, the SMA was expanded to 51 1/2 townships, or about 4,700 km^{2} or 1,800 sq mi. This expansion pushes the northern limit of the SMA to within 12 miles (19 km) of Wood Buffalo National Park, a UNESCO World Heritage Site.

The Albian Sands mine (operated by Shell Canada) opened in 2003. All three of these mines are associated with bitumen upgraders that convert the unusable bitumen into synthetic crude oil for shipment to refineries in Canada and the United States. For Albian, the upgrader is at Scotford, 439 km south. The bitumen, diluted with a solvent, is transferred there in a 610 mm (24 in) corridor pipeline.

The Energy Resource Conservation Board has approved over 100 mining and in-situ projects despite the negative environmental impacts. As of 2012, there were nine active open mining projects, more than 50 approved in-situ projects as well as 190 primary recovery projects extracting bitumen that is free flowing. The ERCB has also approved 20 projects that are testing unproven technology as well as new versions of existing technologies.

== Bitumen extraction ==
=== Surface mining ===
Since Great Canadian Oil Sands (now Suncor) started operation of its mine in 1967, bitumen has been extracted on a commercial scale from the Athabasca Oil Sands by surface mining. In the Athabasca sands there are very large amounts of bitumen covered by little overburden, making surface mining the most efficient method of extracting it. The overburden consists of water-laden muskeg (peat bog) over top of clay and barren sand. The oil sands themselves are typically 40 to 60 metres (130 to 200 ft) deep, sitting on top of flat limestone rock. Originally, the sands were mined with draglines and bucket-wheel excavators and moved to the processing plants by conveyor belts.

These early mines had a steep learning curve to deal with before their bitumen mining techniques became efficient. In the intervening years, more effective in-situ production techniques were developed, particularly steam-assisted gravity drainage (SAGD). In-situ methods became increasingly important because only about 20% of the Athabasca oil sands were shallow enough to recover by surface mining, and the SAGD method in particular was very efficient at recovering large amounts of bitumen at a reasonable cost.

In recent years, companies such as Syncrude and Suncor have switched to much cheaper shovel-and-truck operations using the biggest power shovels (at least 100 short tons; 91 t) and dump trucks (400 short tons; 360 t) in the world. This has held production costs to around US$27 per barrel of synthetic crude oil despite rising energy and labour costs.

After excavation, hot water and caustic soda (sodium hydroxide) is added to the sand, and the resulting slurry is piped to the extraction plant where it is agitated and the oil skimmed from the top. Provided that the water chemistry is appropriate to allow bitumen to separate from sand and clay, the combination of hot water and agitation releases bitumen from the oil sand, and allows small air bubbles to attach to the bitumen droplets. The bitumen froth floats to the top of separation vessels, and is further treated to remove residual water and fine solids.

About two short tons (1.8 t) of oil sands are required to produce one barrel (1/8 short ton; 110 kg) of oil. Originally, roughly 75% of the bitumen was recovered from the sand. However, recent enhancements to this method include Tailings Oil Recovery (TOR) units which recover oil from the tailings, Diluent Recovery Units to recover naphtha from the froth, inclined plate settlers (IPS) and disc centrifuges. These allow the extraction plants to recover well over 90% of the bitumen in the sand. After oil extraction, the spent sand and other materials are then returned to the mine, which is eventually reclaimed.

Alberta Taciuk Process technology extracts bitumen from oil sands through a dry retorting. During this process, oil sand is moved through a rotating drum, cracking the bitumen with heat and producing lighter hydrocarbons. Although tested, this technology is not in commercial use yet.

The original process for extraction of bitumen from the sands was developed by Dr. Karl Clark, working with the Alberta Research Council in the 1920s. Today, all of the producers doing surface mining, such as Syncrude Canada, Suncor Energy and Albian Sands Energy etc., use a variation of the Clark Hot Water Extraction (CHWE) process. In this process, the ores are mined using open-pit mining technology. The mined ore is then crushed for size reduction. Hot water at 50–80 °C (122–176 °F) is added to the ore and the formed slurry is transported using hydrotransport line to a primary separation vessel (PSV) where bitumen is recovered by flotation as bitumen froth. The recovered bitumen froth consists of 60% bitumen, 30% water and 10% solids by weight.

The recovered bitumen froth needs to be cleaned to reject the contained solids and water to meet the requirement of downstream upgrading processes. Depending on the bitumen content in the ore, between 90 and 100% of the bitumen can be recovered using modern hot water extraction techniques. After oil extraction, the spent sand and other materials are then returned to the mine, which is eventually reclaimed.

=== Steam-assisted gravity drainage ===
Steam-assisted gravity drainage (SAGD) is an enhanced oil recovery technology for producing heavy crude oil and bitumen. It is an advanced form of steam stimulation in which a pair of horizontal wells are drilled into the oil reservoir, one a few metres above the other. High pressure steam is continuously injected into the upper wellbore to heat the oil and reduce its viscosity, causing the heated oil to drain into the lower wellbore, where it is pumped out to a bitumen recovery facility. Dr. Roger Butler, engineer at Imperial Oil from 1955 to 1982, invented steam-assisted gravity drainage (SAGD) in the 1970s. Butler "developed the concept of using horizontal pairs of wells and injected steam to develop certain deposits of bitumen considered too deep for mining."

More recently, in situ methods like steam-assisted gravity drainage (SAGD) and cyclic steam stimulation (CSS) have been developed to extract bitumen from deep deposits by injecting steam to heat the sands and reduce the bitumen viscosity so that it can be pumped out like conventional crude oil.

The standard extraction process requires huge amounts of natural gas. As of 2007, the oil sands industry used about 4% of the Western Canada Sedimentary Basin natural gas production. By 2015, this may increase two-and-a-half-fold.

According to the National Energy Board, it requires about 1,200 cubic feet (34 m^{3}) of natural gas to produce one barrel of bitumen from in situ projects and about 700 cubic feet (20 m^{3}) for integrated projects. Since a barrel of oil equivalent is about 6,000 cubic feet (170 m^{3}) of gas, this represents a large gain in energy. That being the case, it is likely that Alberta regulators will reduce exports of natural gas to the United States in order to provide fuel to the oil sands plants. As gas reserves are exhausted, however, oil upgraders will probably turn to bitumen gasification to generate their own fuel. In much the same way as bitumen can be converted into synthetic crude oil, it can also be converted into synthetic natural gas.

== Environmental impacts ==
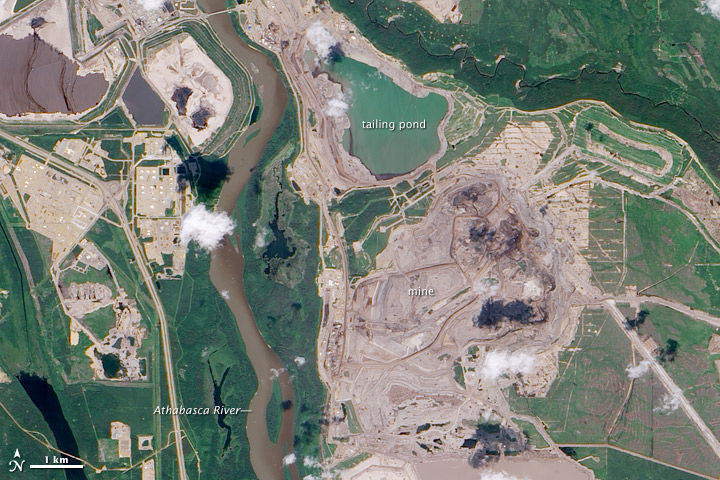
Mining operations in the Athabasca oil sands. Image shows the Athabasca River about 600m from the tailings pond. NASA Earth Observatory photo, 2009.

=== Land ===
The oil sands have been described by first nations peoples, scientists, lawyers, journalists and environmental groups as ecocide. Approximately 20% of Alberta's oil sands are recoverable through open-pit mining, while 80% require in situ extraction technologies (largely because of their depth). Open pit mining destroys the boreal forest and muskeg, while in situ extraction technologies cause less significant damage. Approximately 0.19% of the Alberta boreal forest has been disturbed by open pit mining. The Alberta government requires companies to restore the land to "equivalent land capability". This means that the ability of the land to support various land uses after reclamation is similar to what existed, but that the individual land uses may not necessarily be identical.

In some particular circumstances the government considers agricultural land to be equivalent to forest land. Oil sands companies have reclaimed mined land to use as pasture for wood bison instead of restoring it to the original boreal forest and muskeg. Syncrude asserts they have reclaimed 22% of their disturbed land, a figure disputed by other sources, who assess Syncrude more accurately reclaimed only 0.2% of its disturbed land.

=== Water ===
A Pembina Institute report stated "To produce one cubic metre (m^{3}) [35 cu ft] of synthetic crude oil (SCO) (upgraded bitumen) in a mining operation requires about 2–4.5 m^{3} [71–159 cu ft] of water (net figures). Approved oil sands mining operations are currently licensed to divert 359 million m^{3} from the Athabasca River, or more than twice the volume of water required to meet the annual municipal needs of the City of Calgary." It went on to say "... the net water requirement to produce a cubic metre of oil with in situ production may be as little as 0.2 m^{3} [7.1 cu ft], depending on how much is recycled".

The Athabasca River runs 1,231 kilometres (765 mi) from the Athabasca Glacier in west-central Alberta to Lake Athabasca in northeastern Alberta. The average annual flow just downstream of Fort McMurray is 633 cubic metres per second (22,400 cu ft/s) with its highest daily average measuring 1,200 cubic metres per second.

Water licence allocations total about 1% of the Athabasca River average annual flow, though actual withdrawals for all uses, in 2006, amount to about 0.4%. In addition, the Alberta government sets strict limits on how much water oil sands companies can remove from the Athabasca River. According to the Water Management Framework for the Lower Athabasca River, during periods of low river flow water consumption from the Athabasca River is limited to 1.3% of annual average flow. The province of Alberta is also looking into cooperative withdrawal agreements between oil sands operators.

Since the beginning of the oil sands development, there have been several leaks into the Athabasca River polluting it with oil and tailing pond water. The close proximity of the tailing ponds to the river drastically increases the likelihood of contamination due to ground water leakages. In 1997, Suncor admitted that their tailing ponds had been leaking 1,600 cubic metres (57,000 cu ft) of toxic water into the river a day. This water contains naphthenic acid, trace metals such as mercury and other pollutants. The Athabasca River is the largest freshwater delta in the world but with Suncor and Syncrude leaking tail ponds the amount of polluted water will exceed 1 billion cubic meters by 2020.

Natural toxicants derived from bitumen in Northern Alberta pose potential ecological and human health risks to people living in the area. Oil sands development contributes arsenic, cadmium, chromium, lead, mercury, nickel and other metal elements toxic at low concentrations to the tributaries and rivers of the Athabasca.

=== Emissions ===
As of 2024, oilsands account for 8% of the total of Canadian emissions. Emissions from the oilsands continue to increase, while most other sources are decreasing.

The processing of bitumen into synthetic crude requires energy generated by burning natural gas. In 2007, the oil sands used around 1 billion cubic feet (28,000,000 m^{3}) of natural gas per day, around 40% of Alberta's total usage. Based on gas purchases, natural gas requirements are given by the Canadian Energy Resource Institute as 2.14 GJ (2.04 thousand cu ft) per barrel for cyclic steam stimulation projects, 1.08 GJ (1.03 thousand cu ft) per barrel for SAGD projects, 0.55 GJ (0.52 thousand cu ft) per barrel for bitumen extraction in mining operations not including upgrading or 1.54 GJ (1.47 thousand cu ft) per barrel for extraction and upgrading in mining operations.

A 2009 study by CERA estimated that production from Canada's oil sands emits "about 5 percent to 15 percent more carbon dioxide, over the "well-to-wheels" lifetime analysis of the fuel, than average crude oil." Author and investigative journalist David Strahan that same year stated that IEA figures show that carbon dioxide emissions from the oil sands are 20% higher than average emissions from oil, explaining the discrepancy as the difference between upstream emissions and life cycle emissions. He goes on to say that a US government report in 2005 suggested with current technology conventional oil releases 40 kg of carbon dioxide per barrel while non-conventional oil releases 80–115 kg of carbon dioxide. Alberta energy suggests lower releases of carbon with improving technology, giving a value of 39% drop in emissions per barrel between 1990 and 2008, however only a 29% reduction between 1990 and 2009.

The forecast growth in synthetic oil production in Alberta also threatens Canada's international commitments. In ratifying the Kyoto Protocol, Canada agreed to reduce, by 2012, its greenhouse gas emissions by 6% with respect to 1990. In 2002, Canada's total greenhouse gas emissions had increased by 24% since 1990.

Ranked as the world's eighth largest emitter of greenhouse gases, Canada is a relatively large emitter given its population and is missing its Kyoto targets. A major Canadian initiative called the Integrated CO_{2} Network (ICO2N) promotes the development of large scale capture, transport and storage of carbon dioxide (CO_{2}) as a means of helping Canada to help meet climate change objectives while supporting economic growth. ICO2N members represent a group of industry participants, many oil sands producers, providing a framework for carbon capture and storage development in Canada.

Two separate fraud lawsuits were filed against "ExxonMobil involving Alberta's oilsands" in October. One was in New York and the second was filed in Massachusetts on October 24. The Massachusetts lawsuit says that ExxonMobil misled investors by "falsely" justifying to them "its riskiest long-term investments, including Canadian bitumen oilsands projects." The company did not warn investors "about what climate change measures could cost its operations — especially those in the oilsands."

In December 2022, the Pathways Alliance, a consortium of six companies Canadian Natural Resources, Cenovus Energy, Imperial Oil, MEG Energy, Suncor Energy and ConocoPhillips, which together are responsible for about 95% of Canada's oil sands production, announced that exploratory drilling would begin that winter to create underground reservoirs in northern Alberta, where carbon captured during the process of oil sands extraction would be stored. The proposal, which may take several years to gain regulatory approval, includes the construction of a pipeline to transport captured carbon from over twenty oil sands facilities to an underground storage facility near Cold Lake.

The same month, Athabasca Oil Corporation, Canada's 10th largest oil producer, announced that it would build a carbon capture and storage facility at its Leismer oil sands well site near Conklin, Alberta in partnership with Entropy Inc., which is funding the project. Athabasca Oil said that it aims for a 30% reduction in emissions from the extraction process by 2025.

=== Animals ===
In Northern Alberta, oil development activities bring an enormous number of people into a fragile ecosystem. Historically, population figures have been very low for this region. Water is easily polluted because the water table reaches the surface in most areas of muskeg. With the ever-increasing development and extraction of resources, wildlife are recipient to both direct and indirect effects of pollution. Woodland Caribou are particularly sensitive to human activities, and as such are pushed away from their preferred habitat during the time of year when their caloric needs are greatest and food is the most scarce. Humans' effect on the caribou is compounded by road construction and habitat fragmentation that open the area up to deer and wolves.

Wildlife living near the Athabasca River have been greatly impacted due to pollutants entering the water system. An unknown number of birds die each year. Particularly visible and hard hit are migrating birds that stop to rest at tailing ponds. There have been numerous reports of large flocks of ducks landing in tailing ponds and perishing soon after. Data has been recorded since the 1970s on the number of birds found on tailing ponds.

There has also been a large impact on the fish that live and spawn in the area. As toxins accumulate in the river due to the oil sands, bizarre mutations, tumors, and deformed fish species have begun to appear. A study commissioned by the region's health authority found that several known toxins and carcinogens were elevated. Aboriginal communities that live around the river are becoming increasingly worried about how the animals they eat and their drinking water are being affected.

While there has been no link yet made between the oil sands and health issues, Matt Price of Environmental Defense says the connection makes common sense. Deformities in fish and high concentrations of toxic substances in animals have also been identified.

=== Tailings ponds ===
Large volumes of tailings are a byproduct of bitumen extraction from the oil sands and managing these tailings is one of the most difficult environmental challenges facing the oil sands industry. Tailings ponds are engineered dam and dyke systems that contain solvents used in the separation process as well as residual bitumen, salts and soluble organic compounds, fine silts and water. The concentrations of chemicals may be harmful to fish and oil on the surface harmful to birds. These settling basins were meant to be temporary. A major hindrance to the monitoring of oil sands produced waters has been the lack of identification of individual compounds present. By better understanding the nature of the highly complex mixture of compounds, including naphthenic acids, it may be possible to monitor rivers for leachate and also to remove toxic components. Such identification of individual acids has for many years proved to be impossible but a breakthrough in 2011 in analysis began to reveal what is in the oil sands tailings ponds. Ninety percent of the tailings water can be reused for oil extraction. By 2009 as tailing ponds continued to proliferate and volumes of fluid tailings increased, the Alberta Energy Resources Conservation Board issued Directive 074 to force oil companies to manage tailings based on new aggressive criteria. The Government of Alberta reported in 2013 that tailings ponds in the Alberta oil sands covered an area of about 77 square kilometres (30 sq mi). The Tailings Management Framework for Mineable Oil Sands is part of Alberta's Progressive Reclamation Strategy for the oil sands to ensure that tailings are reclaimed as quickly as possible.

Suncor invested $1.2 billion in their Tailings Reduction Operations (TROTM) method that treats mature fine tails (MFT) from tailings ponds with chemical flocculant, an anionic Polyacrylamide, commonly used in water treatment plants to improve removal of total organic content (TOC), to speed their drying into more easily reclaimable matter. Mature tailings dredged from a pond bottom in suspension were mixed with a polymer flocculant and spread over a "beach" with a shallow grade where the tailings would dewater and dry under ambient conditions. The dried MFT can then be reclaimed in place or moved to another location for final reclamation. Suncor hoped this would reduce the time for water reclamation from tailings to weeks rather than years, with the recovered water being recycled into the oil sands plant. Suncor claimed the mature fines tailings process would reduce the number of tailing ponds and shorten the time to reclaim a tailing pond from 40 years at present to 7–10 years, with land rehabilitation continuously following 7 to 10 years behind the mining operations. For the reporting periods from 2010 to 2012, Suncor had a lower-than-expected fines capture performance from this technology. Syncrude used the older composite tailings (CT) technology to capture fines at its Mildred Lake project. Syncrude had a lower-than-expected fines capture performance in 2011–2012 but exceeded expectations in 2010–2011. Shell used atmospheric fines drying (AFD) technology combined "fluid tailings and flocculants and deposits the mixture in a sloped area to allow the water to drain and the deposit to dry" and had a lower-than-expected fines capture performance.

By 2010 Suncor had transformed their first tailings pond, Pond One, into Wapisiw Lookout, the first reclaimed settling basin in the oil sands. In 2007 the area was a 220-hectare pond of toxic effluent but several years later there was firm land planted with black spruce and trembling aspen. Wapisiw Lookout represents only one percent of tailings ponds in 2011 but Pond One was the first effluent pond in the oil sands industry in 1967 and was used until 1997. By 2011 only 65 square kilometres were cleaned up and about one square kilometre was certified by Alberta as a self-sustaining natural environment. Wapisiw Lookout has not yet been certified. Closure operations of Pond One began in 2007. The jello-like mature fine tails (MFT) were pumped and dredged out of the pond and relocated to another tailings pond for long-term storage and treatment. The MFT was then replaced with 30 million tonnes clean sand and then topsoil that had been removed from the site in the 1960s. The 1.2 million cubic meters (42×10^{6} cu ft) of topsoil over the surface, to a depth of 50 cm (1 ft 8 in), was placed on top of the sand in the form of hummocks and swales. It was then planted with reclamation plants.

In March 2012 an alliance of oil companies called Canada's Oil Sands Innovation Alliance (COSIA) was launched with a mandate to share research and technology to decrease the negative environmental impact of oil sands production focusing on tailings ponds, greenhouse gases, water and land. Almost all the water used to produce crude oil using steam methods of production ends up in tailings ponds. Recent enhancements to this method include Tailings Oil Recovery (TOR) units which recover oil from the tailings, Diluent Recovery Units to recover naphtha from the froth, Inclined Plate Settlers (IPS) and disc centrifuges. These allow the extraction plants to recover well over 90% of the bitumen in the sand.

In January 2013, scientists from Queen's University published a report analyzing lake sediments in the Athabasca region over the past fifty years. They found that levels of polycyclic aromatic hydrocarbons (PAHs) had increased as much as 23-fold since bitumen extraction began in the 1960s. Levels of carcinogenic, mutagenic, and teratogenic PAHs were substantially higher than guidelines for lake sedimentation set by the Canadian Council of Ministers of the Environment in 1999. The team discovered that the contamination spread farther than previously thought.

The Pembina Institute suggested that the huge investments by many companies in Canadian oil sands leading to increased production results in excess bitumen with no place to store it. It added that by 2022 a month's output of waste-water could result in a 11-foot-deep (3 m) toxic reservoir the size of New York City's Central Park [840.01 acres; 339.94 hectares; 3.3994 square kilometres].

The oil sands industry may build a series of up to thirty lakes by pumping water into old mine pits when they have finished excavation leaving toxic effluent at their bottoms and letting biological processes restore it to health. It is less expensive to fill abandoned open pit mines with water instead of dirt. In 2012 the Cumulative Environmental Management Association (CEMA) described End Pit Lakes (EPL) as

An engineered water body, located below grade in an oil sands post-mining pit. It may contain oil sands by-product material and will receive surface and groundwater from surrounding reclaimed and undisturbed landscapes. EPLs will be permanent features in the final reclaimed landscape, discharging water to the downstream environment.

— CEMA 2012

CEMA acknowledged that the "main concern is the potential for EPLs to develop a legacy of toxicity and thus reduce the land use value of the oil sands region in the future." Syncrude Canada was planning the first end pit lake in 2013 with the intention of "pumping fresh water over 40 vertical metres of mine effluent that it has deposited in what it calls 'base mine lake.'" David Schindler argued that no further end pit lakes should be approved until we "have some assurance that they will eventually support a healthy ecosystem." There is to date no "evidence to support their viability, or the 'modelled' results suggesting that outflow from the lakes will be non-toxic."

=== Pipeline-processing pollution ===
Oil sands and especially the related projects, like the construction of a new pipeline, also have a social impact. Most of all, the local population groups would suffer from the effects of a new oil pipeline. In addition to the risk of general oil spills, there is now also the danger of gathering food due to the pollution of the fields and waters. Despite the fact that most people in those areas are not well off, the money is still used to build new projects instead of spending it on improving the quality of life there. Furthermore, adding a new pipeline to the already existing oil pipelines would increase our dependence on fossil fuels.

In July 2015, one of the largest leaks in Canada's history spilled 5,000 cubic metres of emulsion — about 5 million litres of bitumen, sand and wastewater — from a Nexen Energy pipeline at a Long Lake oil sands facility, south of Fort McMurray. The subsidiary of China's CNOOC Ltd. automated safety systems had not detected the pipeline fault that caused the spill to cover an area of about 16,000 square metres prior to manual inspection. Alberta Energy Regulator (AER) revealed the number of pipeline "incidents" in Alberta increased 15% last year, despite the regulator's well-publicized efforts to reduce ruptures and spills.

=== Occupational health and safety ===
An explosion left one worker dead and another seriously injured at the Chinese-owned Nexen Energy facility in the Long Lake oil sands near Anzac, south of Fort McMurray The two maintenance workers involved were found near natural gas compression equipment used for a hydrocracker, which turns heavy oil into lighter crude, at the plant's main processing facility, known as an upgrader.

== Population ==
The Athabasca oil sands are in the northeastern portion of the Canadian province of Alberta, near the city of Fort McMurray. The area is only sparsely populated, and in the late 1950s, it was primarily a wilderness outpost of a few hundred people whose main economic activities included fur trapping and salt mining. From a population of 37,222 in 1996, the boomtown of Fort McMurray and the surrounding region (known as the Regional Municipality of Wood Buffalo) grew to 79,810 people as of 2006, including a "shadow population" of 10,442 living in work camps. The community struggled to provide services and housing for migrant workers, many of them from Eastern Canada, especially Newfoundland. Fort McMurray ceased to be an incorporated city in 1995 and is now an urban service area within Wood Buffalo.

== Estimated oil reserves ==
By 2015, Venezuela accounted for 18%, Saudi Arabia for 16.1%, and Canada for 10.3% of the world's proven oil reserves, according to NRCAN.

The Alberta government's Energy and Utilities Board (EUB) estimated in 2007 that about 173 billion barrels (27.5×10^{9} m^{3}) of crude bitumen were economically recoverable from the three Alberta oil sands areas based on then-current technology and price projections from the 2006 market prices of $62 per barrel for benchmark West Texas Intermediate (WTI), rising to a projected $69 per barrel. This was equivalent to about 10% of the estimated 1,700 billion barrels (270×10^{9} m^{3}) of bitumen-in-place. Alberta estimated that the Athabasca deposits alone contain 35 billion barrels (5.6×10^{9} m^{3}) of surface mineable bitumen and 98 billion barrels (15.6×10^{9} m^{3}) of bitumen recoverable by in-situ methods. These estimates of Canada's reserves were doubted when they were first published but are now largely accepted by the international oil industry. Canada had proved oil reserves of 163 billion barrels as of January 2024, ranking fourth in the world behind Venezuela, Saudi Arabia, and Iran.

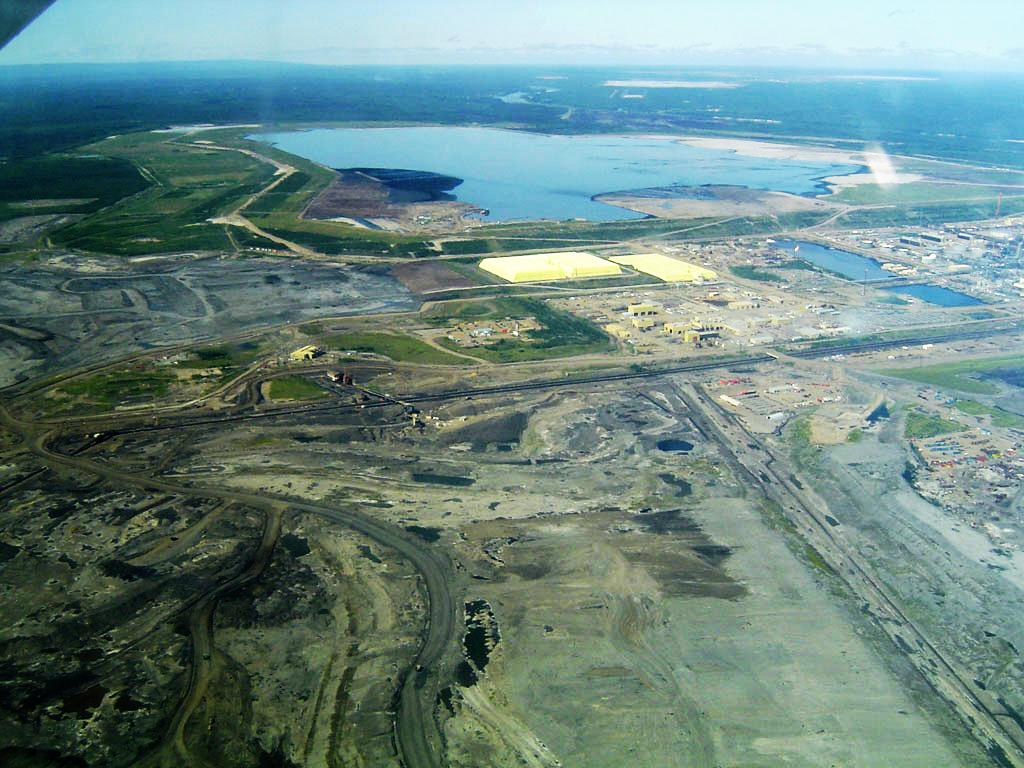
Syncrude's Mildred Lake mine site and plant

Only 3% of the initial established crude bitumen reserves have been produced since commercial production started in 1967. At rate of production projected for 2015, about 3 million barrels per day (480×10^{3} m^{3}/d), the Athabasca oil sands reserves would last over 170 years. However those production levels require an influx of workers into an area that until recently was largely uninhabited. By 2007 this need in northern Alberta drove unemployment rates in Alberta and adjacent British Columbia to the lowest levels in history. As far away as the Atlantic Provinces, where workers were leaving to work in Alberta, unemployment rates fell to levels not seen for over one hundred years.

The Venezuelan Orinoco Oil Sands site may contain more oil sands than Athabasca. However, while the Orinoco deposits are less viscous and more easily produced using conventional techniques (the Venezuelan government prefers to call them "extra-heavy oil"), they are too deep to access by surface mining.

== Economics ==
Despite the large reserves, the cost of extracting the oil from bituminous sands has historically made production of the oil sands unprofitable—the cost of selling the extracted crude would not cover the direct costs of recovery; labour to mine the sands and fuel to extract the crude.

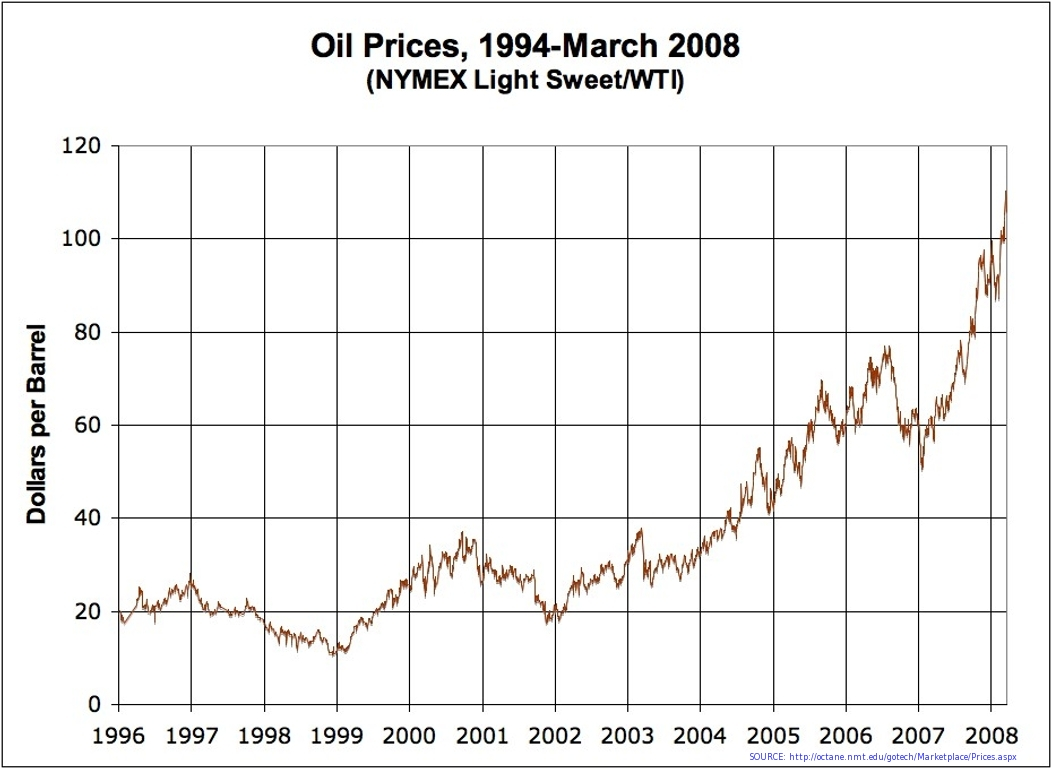
Oil prices 1996–2008 (not adjusted for inflation)

In mid-2006, the National Energy Board of Canada estimated the operating cost of a new mining operation in the Athabasca oil sands to be CA$9 to CA$12 per barrel, while the cost of an in-situ SAGD operation (using dual horizontal wells) would be CA$10 to CA$14 per barrel. This compares to operating costs for conventional oil wells which can range from less than one dollar per barrel in Iraq and Saudi Arabia to over six in the United States and Canada's conventional oil reserves.

The capital cost of the equipment required to mine the sands and haul it to processing is a major consideration in starting production. The NEB estimates that capital costs raise the total cost of production to CA$18 to CA$20 per barrel for a new mining operation and CA$18 to CA$22 per barrel for a SAGD operation. This does not include the cost of upgrading the crude bitumen to synthetic crude oil, which makes the final costs CA$36 to CA$40 per barrel for a new mining operation.

Therefore, although high crude prices make the cost of production very attractive, sudden drops in price leaves producers unable to recover their capital costs—although the companies are well financed and can tolerate long periods of low prices since the capital has already been spent and they can typically cover incremental operating costs.

However, the development of commercial production is made easier by the fact that exploration costs are very low. Such costs are a major factor when assessing the economics of drilling in a traditional oil field. The location of the oil deposits in the oil sands are well known, and an estimate of recovery costs can usually be made easily. There is not another region in the world with energy deposits of comparable magnitude where it would be less likely that the installations would be confiscated by a hostile national government, or be endangered by a war or revolution.

As a result of the oil price increases since 2003, the economics of oil sands have improved dramatically. At a world price of US$50 per barrel, the NEB estimated an integrated mining operation would make a rate return of 16 to 23%, while a SAGD operation would return 16 to 27%. Prices since 2006 have risen, exceeding US$145 in mid-2008 but falling back to less than 40 US$ as a result of the worldwide financial crisis, the oil price recovered slowly and many of the planned projects (expected to exceed CA$100 billion between 2006 and 2015) were stopped or scheduled. In 2012 and 2013 the oil price was high again, but the US production is increasing due to new technologies, while the gasoline demand is falling, so there is an overproduction of oil. But recovering economy can change this in a few years.

At present the area around Fort McMurray has seen the most effect from the increased activity in the oil sands. Although jobs are plentiful, housing is in short supply and expensive. People seeking work often arrive in the area without arranging accommodation, driving up the price of temporary accommodation. The area is isolated, with only a two-lane road, Alberta Highway 63, connecting it to the rest of the province, and there is pressure on the government of Alberta to improve road links as well as hospitals and other infrastructure.

Despite the best efforts of companies to move as much of the construction work as possible out of the Fort McMurray area, and even out of Alberta, the shortage of skilled workers is spreading to the rest of the province. Even without the oil sands, the Alberta economy would be very strong, but development of the oil sands has resulted in the strongest period of economic growth ever recorded by a Canadian province.

== Geopolitical importance ==
The Athabasca oil sands hold geopolitical significance.

An agreement has been signed between PetroChina and Enbridge to build a 400,000 barrels per day (64,000 m^{3}/d) pipeline from Edmonton, Alberta, to the west coast port of Kitimat, British Columbia. If it is built, the pipeline will help export synthetic crude oil from the oil sands to China and elsewhere in the Pacific. However, in 2011, First Nations and environmental groups protested the proposed pipeline, stating that its construction and operation would be destructive to the environment. First Nations groups also claim that the development of the proposed pipeline is in violation of commitments that the Government of Canada has made through various Treaties and the UN Declaration of the Rights of Indigenous Peoples. A smaller pipeline will also be built alongside to import condensate to dilute the bitumen. Sinopec, the largest refining and chemical company in China, and China National Petroleum Corporation have bought or are planning to buy shares in major oil sands development.

On August 20, 2009, the U.S. State Department issued a presidential permit for an Alberta Clipper Pipeline that will run from Hardisty, Alberta, to Superior, Wisconsin. The pipeline will be capable of carrying up to 450,000 barrels (72,000 m^{3}) of crude oil a day to refineries in the U.S.

== Indigenous peoples of the area ==
Indigenous peoples of the area include the Fort McKay First Nation. The oil sands themselves are located within the boundaries of Treaty 8, signed in 1899.

We had to solemnly assure them that only such laws as to hunting and fishing as were in the interest of the Indians and were found necessary in order to protect the fish and fur-bearing animals would be made, and that they would be as free to hunt and fish after the treaty as they would be if they never entered into it. ... It does not appear likely that the conditions of the country on either side of the Athabasca and Slave Rivers or about Athabasca Lake will be so changed as to affect hunting or trapping, and it is safe to say that so long as the fur-bearing animals remain, the great bulk of the Indians will continue to hunt and to trap.

— The Honourable Clifford Sifton, Superintendent General of Indian Affairs, Report of Commissioners for Treaty No. 8, Winnipeg, Manitoba, September 22, 1899

The Fort McKay First Nation has formed several companies to service the oil sands industry and will be developing a mine on their territory. Opposition remaining within the First Nation focuses on environmental stewardship, land rights, and health issues, like elevated cancer rates in Fort Chipewyan and deformed fish being found by commercial fishermen in Lake Athabasca.

The Alberta Cancer Board published research of the cancer rates of those living in Fort Chipewyan in 2009. While many companies argue that there are not enough chemicals and toxic material in the water due to the development of the oil sands, this report indicates that there is coincidentally a significantly higher rate of cancer within this community. There have been many speculations as to why there is a higher rate of cancer in this community; some of those speculations are contamination with the river and the oil sands as well as uranium mining. The world's largest production of uranium is in this area as well as along the Athabasca River, allowing for easy contamination of the river.

From 2010 to 2014, the Tar Sands Healing Walk, founded by Indigenous women, was held annually as a demonstration against oil extraction and the damage it caused to local communities and the environment.

== Impact of oil sands and pipeline development on Indigenous groups ==
According to some environmental activists, pipeline development poses risks to the cultural, social, and economic way of life of Canada's Indigenous populations. Historically, some Indigenous groups have opposed pipeline development for two primary reasons: 1) the perception of inherent environmental risks associated with transporting harmful oil and gas products, and 2) failure by the federal government to properly consider and mitigate Indigenous groups' concerns regarding resource development on their lands. For instance, many Indigenous groups rely heavily on local wildlife and vegetation for their survival. Increased oil production in Canada requires greater oil transport through their traditional lands, which, to some, poses the perception of threats to the survival and traditional way of life of Indigenous groups, as well as the safety and preservation of the surrounding ecosystems. First Nations in Alberta have called particular attention to adverse health impacts related to oil sands emissions, asserting that the water quality testing for specific chemicals (heavy metals) has been insufficient.

Aside from environmental concerns, many Indigenous groups have pushed back against pipeline development due to inadequate consultation processes by the federal government. As per Section 35 of the Canadian Constitution Act Indigenous peoples in Canada are guaranteed the right to be meaningfully consulted with and accommodated when the Crown is contemplating resource development on their lands - see Duty to Consult. Through a series of Supreme Court of Canada rulings and political protests from Indigenous peoples (see Haida Nation v. British Columbia [Minister of Forests], Taku River Tlingit First Nation v British Columbia, and Tsilhqot'in Nation v British Columbia), among others, the courts have attempted to further define the Crown's consultation responsibilities and give legal recognition to Indigenous traditional territory and rights regarding resource development.

Contrarily, oil sands development also presents many positive impacts and opportunities for Indigenous groups, particularly in Western Canada. In fact, over the past two decades, First Nations participation in the energy sector has increased dramatically, from employment and business opportunities to project approval processes and environmental evaluation. Increased Indigenous participation has been encouraged by numerous collaboration agreements with industry, typically in the form of impact benefit agreements (IBAs), which provide not only employment and business ventures, but also job training and community benefits. Enhanced participation in the energy sector has empowered many Indigenous groups to push for wider involvement by negotiating ownership stakes in proposed pipelines and bitumen storage projects. Perhaps the best example of such partnering in Alberta is the agreement between Suncor and Fort McKay and Mikisew Cree First Nations. The two First Nations acquired a 49% ownership in Suncor's East Tank Farm Development with shares valued at about $500 million making it the largest business investment to date by a First Nation entity in Canada.

Support for resource development and desire for direct involvement is further illustrated by the First Nations' led $17-billion Eagle Spirit Energy Holding Ltd. pipeline and energy corridor between Alberta and the northern B.C. coast (with a back-up plan to site its terminal in Alaska to get around the tanker ban in B.C.). The project has secured support from 35 First Nations along the proposed route; the bands are entitled to at least 35% ownership in exchange for the land use.

== Oil sand companies ==
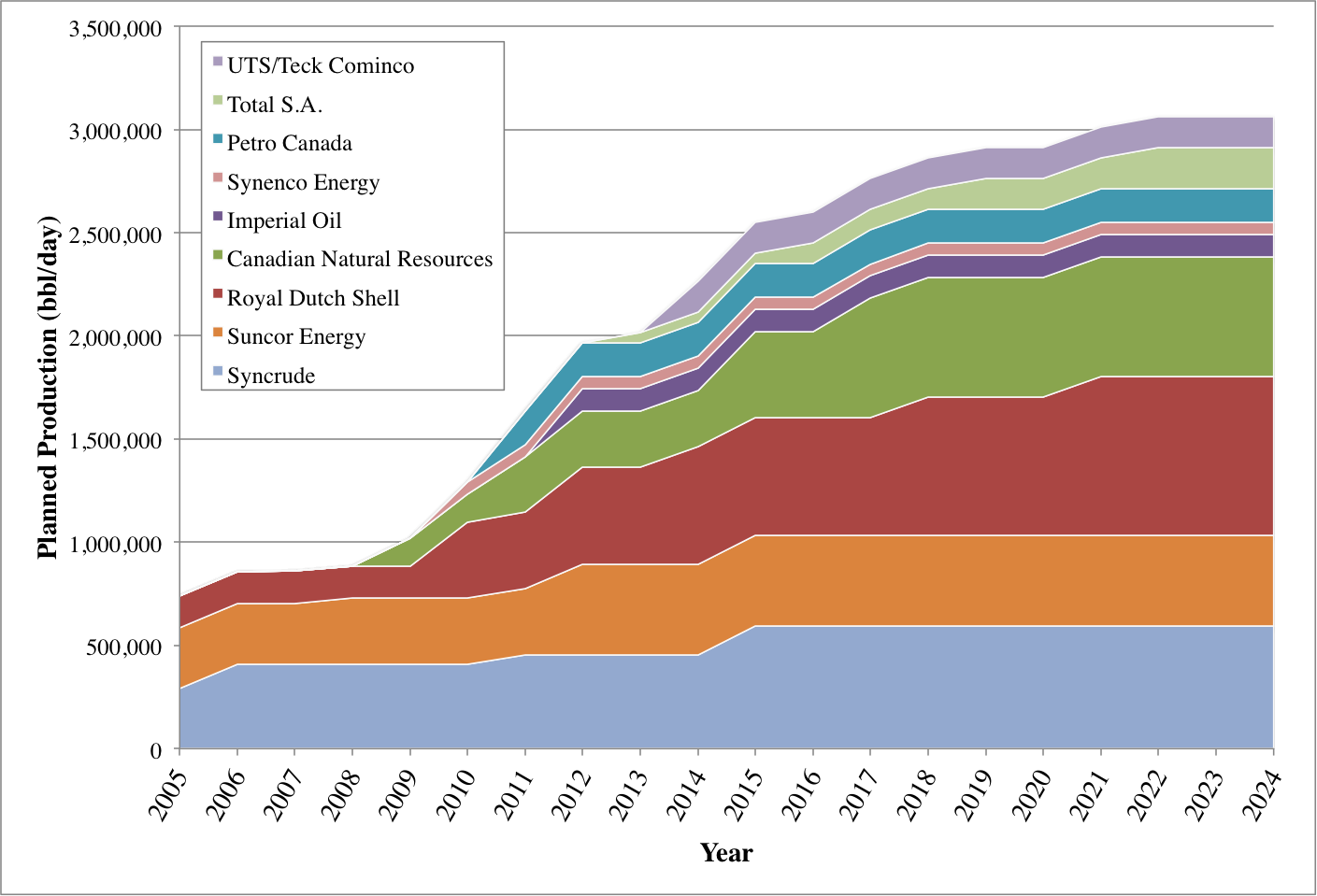
Planned mining operation oil production by various companies. Data from table below.

There are currently three large oil sands mining operations in the area run by Syncrude Canada Limited, Suncor Energy and Albian Sands owned by Shell Canada, Chevron, and Marathon Oil Corp.

Major producing or planned developments in the Athabasca Oil Sands include the following projects:

- Suncor Energy's Steepbank and Millennium mines currently produce 263,000 barrels per day (41,800 m^{3}/d) and its Firebag in-situ project produces 35,000 bbl/d (5,600 m^{3}/d).
- Syncrude's Mildred Lake and Aurora mines currently can produce 360,000 bbl/d (57,000 m^{3}/d).
- Shell Canada currently operates its Muskeg River Mine producing 155,000 bbl/d (24,600 m^{3}/d) and the Scotford Upgrader at Fort Saskatchewan, Alberta.
- Nexen's in-situ Long Lake SAGD project is now producing 70,000 bbl/d (11,000 m^{3}/d).
- TotalEnergies's subsidiary Deer Creek Energy was operating a SAGD project on its Joslyn lease, producing 10,000 bbl/d (1,600 m^{3}/d). It intended on constructing its mine by 2010 to expand its production by 100,000 bbl/d (16,000 m^{3}/d), however this had not occurred by May 2014 when the company shelved the project while it reviewed the economic viability of the project.

Mining Projects (2021)
Operator	Project	Phase	Capacity	Start-up	Regulatory Status
Albian Sands	Jackpine	1A	100,000 bbl/d (16,000 m^{3}/d)	2010	Operating
Albian Sands		1B	100,000 bbl/d (16,000 m^{3}/d)	TBD	Approved
Albian Sands		2	100,000 bbl/d (16,000 m^{3}/d)	TBD	Approved
Albian Sands	Muskeg River	Existing	175,000 bbl/d (27,800 m^{3}/d)	2002	Operating
Albian Sands		Expansion	115,000 bbl/d (18,300 m^{3}/d)	TBD	Approved
Canadian Natural Resources	Horizon	1	135,000 bbl/d (21,500 m^{3}/d)	2009	Operating
Canadian Natural Resources		2A	12,000 bbl/d (1,900 m^{3}/d)	2014	Operating
Canadian Natural Resources		2B	45,000 bbl/d (7,200 m^{3}/d)	2016	Operating
Canadian Natural Resources		3	80,000 bbl/d (13,000 m^{3}/d)	2017	Operating
Canadian Natural Resources	Horizon South	Expansion	95,000 bbl/d (15,100 m^{3}/d)	2022	Approved
Canadian Natural Resources	North Pit		—	2031	Announced
Canadian Natural Resources	Pierre River	1	100,000 bbl/d (16,000 m^{3}/d)	TBD	Approved
Canadian Natural Resources		2	100,000 bbl/d (16,000 m^{3}/d)	TBD	Approved
Imperial Oil	Kearl	1	120,000 bbl/d (19,000 m^{3}/d)	2013	Operating
Imperial Oil		2	120,000 bbl/d (19,000 m^{3}/d)	2015	Operating
Imperial Oil		3	80,000 bbl/d (13,000 m^{3}/d)	TBD	Approved
Imperial Oil		Debottleneck	45,000 bbl/d (7,200 m^{3}/d)	TBD	Approved
Suncor Energy	Base Plant		130,000 bbl/d (21,000 m^{3}/d)	1967	Depleted
Suncor Energy		Debottleneck	4,000 bbl/d (640 m^{3}/d)	2007	Operating
Suncor Energy		Expansion	150,000 bbl/d (24,000 m^{3}/d)	2011	Operating
Suncor Energy	Millenium		294,000 bbl/d (46,700 m^{3}/d)	2001	Operating
Suncor Energy		Debottleneck	23,000 bbl/d (3,700 m^{3}/d)	2008	Operating
Suncor Energy		Expansion	225,000 bbl/d (35,800 m^{3}/d)	2030	Announced
Suncor Energy	Fort Hills	1	165,000 bbl/d (26,200 m^{3}/d)	2018	Operating
Suncor Energy		Debottleneck	20,000 bbl/d (3,200 m^{3}/d)	TBD	Approved
Suncor Energy	Voyageur South	1	250,000 bbl/d (40,000 m^{3}/d)	TBD	Approved
Syncrude	Mildred Lake		150,000 bbl/d (24,000 m^{3}/d)	1978	Operating
Syncrude	Aurora North	1	225,000 bbl/d (35,800 m^{3}/d)	2001	Operating
Syncrude		2	116,300 bbl/d (18,490 m^{3}/d)	2006	Operating
Syncrude		3	184,000 bbl/d (29,300 m^{3}/d)	2023	Approved
Syncrude	Aurora South	1	100,000 bbl/d (16,000 m^{3}/d)	TBD	Announced
Syncrude		2	10,000 bbl/d (1,600 m^{3}/d)	TBD	Announced
Synenco Energy	Northern Lights	1	160,000 bbl/d (25,000 m^{3}/d)	—	Cancelled
TotalEnergies	Joslyn North	1	100,000 bbl/d (16,000 m^{3}/d)	—	Cancelled
UTS/Teck Cominco	Equinox	Lease 14	50,000 bbl/d (7,900 m^{3}/d)	TBD	Announced
UTS/Teck Cominco	Frontier	1	100,000 bbl/d (16,000 m^{3}/d)	—	Cancelled

== Court ordered sanctions ==
For improper diversion of water in 2008–2009, Statoil Canada Ltd. was ordered in 2012 to pay a fine of $5000 and to allocate $185,000 for a training project (The verdict was handed down by the Provincial Court of Alberta, Criminal Division).

== See also ==
- Environmental impact of mining
- Canadian Centre for Energy Information
- History of the petroleum industry in Canada (oil sands and heavy oil)
- Mackenzie Valley Pipeline
- Utah Oil Sands Joint Venture
- Melville Island oil sands
- Project Oilsand / Project Cauldron
- List of articles about Canadian oil sands

== Video material ==
- Dirty Oil. Documentary by Leslie Iwerks, 2009
- H2Oil. Documentary by Shannon Walsh, 2009
- Petropolis: Aerial Perspectives on the Alberta Tar Sands. Documentary by Peter Mettler, 2009
- Tar Sands – Canada for Sale Documentary by Tom Radford, 2008
- People & Power – Alberta's Oil Sands. Al Jazeera English, 2008
- Riz Khan – Canada's dirty oil. Al Jazeera English, 2009
- 60 Minutes – The Alberta Oil Sands. CBS, 22. January 2006
- To the Last Drop. Documentary by Tom Radford about the impact on local communities, broadcast on Al Jazeera English's program Witness, 2011
- The Alberta Oil Sands. Govt. of Alberta Documentary Film, 2009
