= EUB =

EUB may refer to:

- Eidsvoll Ullensaker Blad, a Norwegian newspaper
- Eisenbahn-Unfalluntersuchungsstelle des Bundes, the German Federal Railway Accident Investigation Board
- Electric upright bass, a musical instrument
- Energy and Utilities Board of the Government of Alberta, Canada; now defunct
- Euabalong West railway station, in New South Wales, Australia
- European University of Bangladesh
- Evangelical United Brethren Church, a former Christian denomination in the United States
