= Connacher Oil and Gas =

Canadian oil and gas company

Connacher Oil and Gas Limited
- Type: Public
- Industry: Oil and Gas
- Founded: Calgary, Alberta (1997)
- Headquarters: Calgary, Alberta, Canada
- Key people: Chris Bloomer, Chief Executive Officer, Greg Pollard, Chief Financial Officer, Jesse J. Beaudry, Vice President, Marketing and Transportation Logistics, Merle D. Johnson, Chief Operating Officer
- Products: Oil & gas exploration and production
- Revenue: $872.8 million CAN (2011)
- Website: www.connacheroil.com

Connacher Oil and Gas Limited is a Calgary-based exploration, development and production company active in the production and sale of bitumen in the Athabasca oil sands region. Connacher's shares used to trade on the Toronto Stock Exchange, but it was de-listed in 2016, after filing for insolvency.

Connacher's principal asset is a 100 percent interest in approximately 500 million barrels of proved and probable bitumen reserves located on the company's Great Divide oil sands 50 miles south of Fort McMurray, Alberta. The company's first notional 10,000 bbl/d Steam-assisted gravity drainage (SAGD) oil sands project at Great Divide, Pod One, commenced commercial production in March 2008, just four short years from our first purchase of lands in the region. Algar, the company's second notional 10,000 bbl/d SAGD oil sands project at Great Divide was completed in April 2010, ahead of schedule and under budget, with commerciality achieved effective October 1, 2010. In September 2012, Connacher received approval from the Energy Resources Conservation Board for the development of its 24,000 bbl/d Great Divide Expansion Project.

== History ==
In 2004 founder and CEO Richard Gusella, a veteran in the oil sands, began to build Connacher Oil and Gas Limited in increments by purchasing "one 10,000-barrel-per-day SAGD (steam-assisted gravity drainage) plant at a time," starting with underground oil sands leases south of Fort McMurray. He acquired Montana Refining Company, Inc. in Great Falls, Montana ", to hedge against a huge spread between bitumen and synthetic crude oil prices." This was sold to Calumet Specialty Products Partners, L.P. (NASDAQ: CLMT) in 2012. Connacher also sold the Great Divide Pipeline Company at the same time to Calumet for a combined price of about C$120 million.

In 2007 Connacher's state-of-the-art SAGD Great Divide plant was opened at its Great Divide Pod One, its first 10,000 bpd oil sands project. By 2007, Connacher self-defined as a crude and natural gas exploration, development and production company" with an "extensive reserve, resource and acreage position in the oil sands of Alberta." By 2007 Connacher owned "considerable conventional resources in the Marten Creek, Three Hills and Battrum regions of western Canada; owns and operates a 9,500 barrel per day refinery in Great Falls, Montana and maintains a valuable 26 percent equity stake in Petrolifera Petroleum Limited (PDP - TSX), a public company active in Argentina, Colombia and Peru in South America."

On 17 May 2016 it filed for insolvency.

== Pod One ==
Great Divide Pod One, which began operation in September 2007, is Connacher's initial steam-assisted gravity drainage thermal recovery oil sands project. Pod One has a design steam generation capacity of 27,000 bbl/d. At its long-term target peak operating steam-oil ratio of 2.7, Pod One is expected to facilitate production of approximately 1,600 cubic metres (approximately 10,000 bbl/d) of bitumen over a project life of 25 or more years, before provision for turnarounds and minor interruptions.

== Algar ==
Algar is Connacher's second steam-assisted gravity drainage thermal recovery oil sands project. Algar has a steam generation design capacity of 30,000 bbl/d, which, at its long-term target operating steam-oil ratio of 3.0, is expected to facilitate production of approximately 10,000 bbl/d of bitumen over a project life of more than 25 years, before provision for turnarounds and minor interruptions. Algar is located at Great Divide, approximately eight kilometres east of Pod One.

== Corporate governance ==
Current members of the board of directors of Connacher Oil and Gas Limited are: Bill McCaffrey, Jesse Marble, Perry Schuldhaus, Joe Shammas.

== OPEC, Fracking put pressure on small bitumen production players ==
In late 2014, as the global demand for oil slows down, and production of crude oil remains high in the United States, Canada and in Organization of the Petroleum Exporting Countries, the oil market collapsed into a declining market. While the decision by OPEC to "hold their production steady at 30 million bpd" contributed to the continued price decline of oil, there was a rebound in oil futures on 1 December 2014. The price of West Texas Intermediate (WTI), the benchmark for North American crude dropped to $US68.93 and to the decline in the price of Western Canadian Select, which is the benchmark for emerging heavy, high TAN (acidic) crudes to US$51.93. By early December 2014, Connacher was one of several oilsands bitumen-focused producers to struggle financially due to the drop in the price of oil and a tightening of capital markets. Others include OPTI Canada Inc., Southern Pacific Resources Corp., and Sunshine Oilsands Ltd. On 1 December Connacher which is $1.05 billion in debt hired BMO Capital Markets advisors to undertake a review process of its "liquidity and capital structure." If the price of WTI per barrel was US$75, the Connacher could generate $C70 million of EBITDA in 2015, but it has $90 million in debt payments.

== See also ==
- List of articles about Canadian oil sands
