= Agnes Deans Cameron =

Canadian writer, lecturer, adventurer (1863–1912)

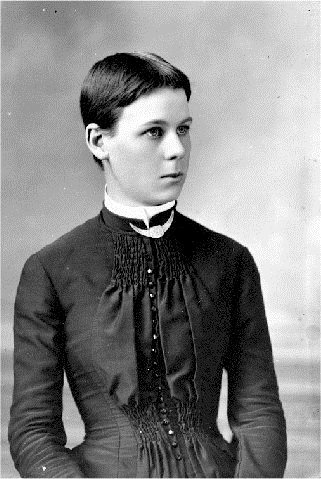
- Agnes Deans Cameron, c. 1885
- Born: 20 December 1863; Victoria, Colony of Vancouver Island
- Died: 13 May 1912; Victoria, British Columbia
- Occupations: writer journalist lecturer educator adventurer
- Organization(s): Institute of Journalists (1910-); Western Canada Immigration Association; Canadian Women's Press Club
- Known for: journalism, social activism, her published book and lectures as the first woman to reach the Arctic Ocean
- Parent(s): Jessie Anderson; Duncan Cameron

Agnes Deans Cameron (20 December 1863 – 13 May 1912) was a Canadian educator, travel writer, journalist, lecturer, and adventurer. She was the first white woman to reach the Arctic Ocean and her published book about the journey was a best-seller. She promoted immigration to Canada through her lectures and publications.

== Early life ==
Agnes Deans Cameron was born in Victoria, Colony of Vancouver Island, the youngest child of Duncan and Jessie Cameron. Duncan Cameron was a successful Scots immigrant miner and contractor. She was an outstanding student at Victoria High School, a public school. While still a student she successfully wrote the provincial teachers' examinations. She taught in the one-room school in Comox in 1882 and then returned to Victoria in 1883 to teach at the private Angela College for girls. By 1894 she was already principal of the South Park School. She was the first woman to hold an administrative office in a co-educational school in Victoria.

== The New North: First white woman in Arctic ==
In 1908 after 25 years of teaching, Cameron accepted a contract with Western Canada Immigration Association based in Chicago. Accompanied by her niece Jessie Brown, and taking her ever-present typewriter and Kodak camera, they began a 10,000-mile round trip to the Arctic Ocean, the first white women to do so. They traveled by train from Chicago, through Winnipeg and Calgary to Edmonton, then took a stagecoach to Athabasca Landing, then they traveled by Hudson's Bay Company fur brigade scows, down the Athabasca River, across Lake Athabasca, to the Slave River, Slave Lake, the Mackenzie River to the Arctic Ocean. On their return journey with a slightly different route to include the Peace River (where Agnes shot a moose) and a steamboat's first voyage on the Slave Lake. Based on this adventure Agnes published her book entitled "The New North".

Cameron traveled extensively as lecturer, showing magic lantern slides of her photographic images from this journey. She promoted immigration to western Canada at Oxford, Cambridge, St. Andrew's University and the Royal Geographical Society. Her photographs were reproduced in 2011–2012 in an exhibit at the Canadian Museum of Civilization in Ottawa, Canada.

=== Athabasca ===
She was particularly enthusiastic about the Athabasca region and the Athabasca oil sands which included photos of Count Alfred Von Hammerstein's oil drill works along the Athabasca River. "While the Count was unsuccessful drilling for "elephant pools of oil," Cameron's book and its images became a best seller and made her a media celebrity."

In all Canada there is no more interesting stretch of waterway than that upon which we are entering. An earth-movement here has created a line of fault clearly visible for seventy or eighty miles along the river-bank, out of which oil oozes at frequent intervals. ... Tar there is ... in plenty. ... It oozes from every fissure, and into some bituminous tar well we can poke a twenty-foot pole and find no resistance.

== Gallery of lantern slides ==
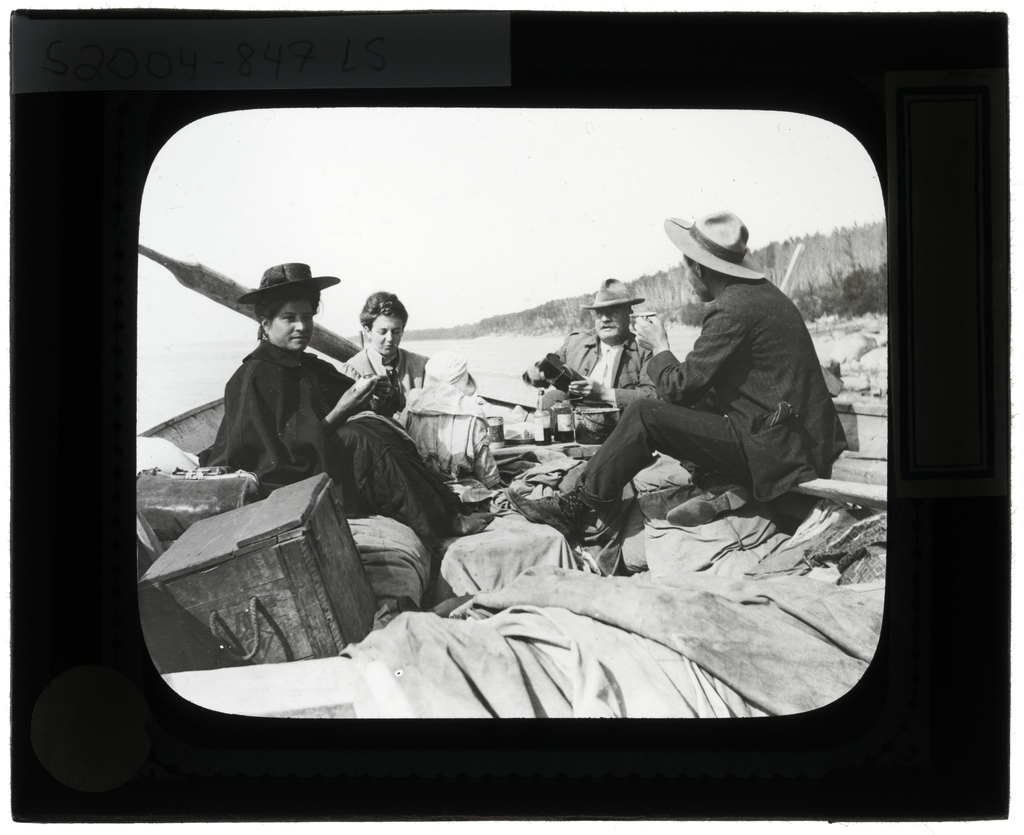
Tea on board the scow Mee-wah-sin on the Peace River, Alberta

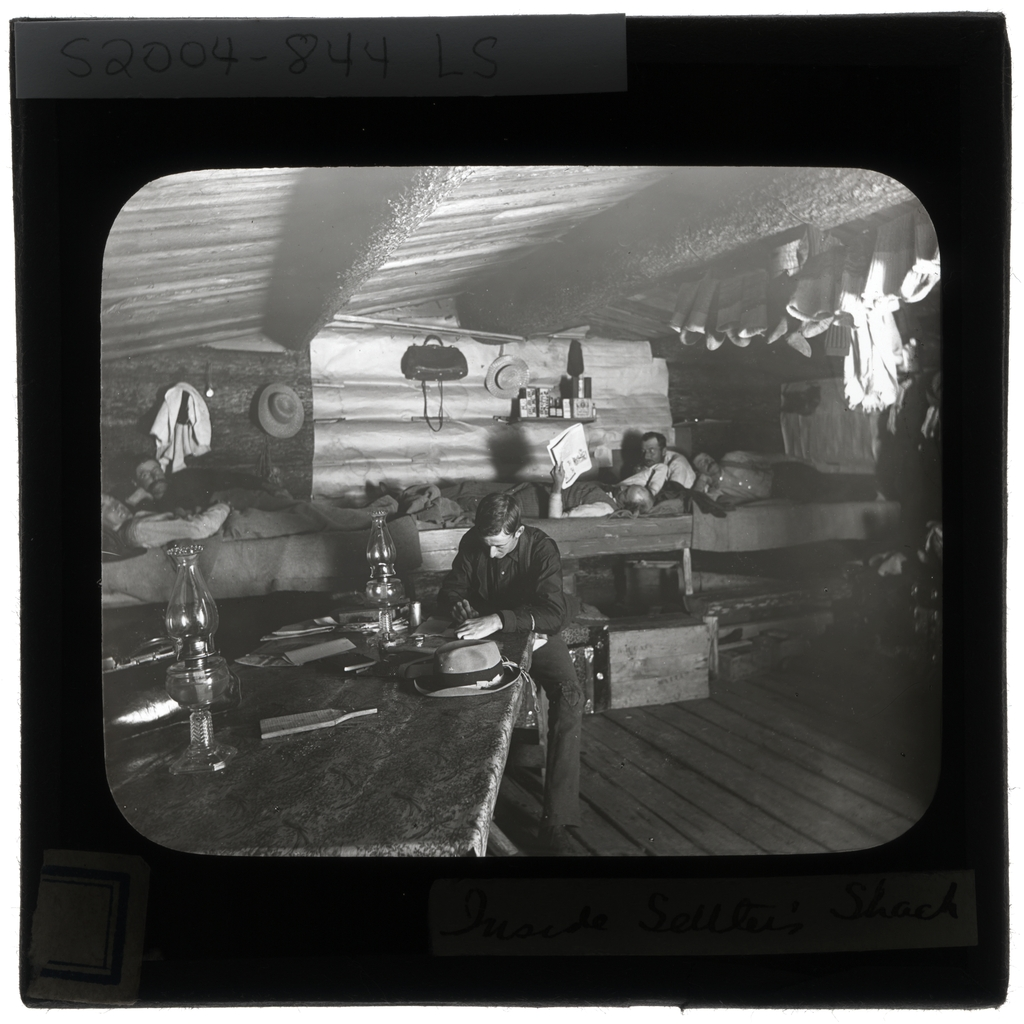
Inside a Settler's Shack of the West of Canada

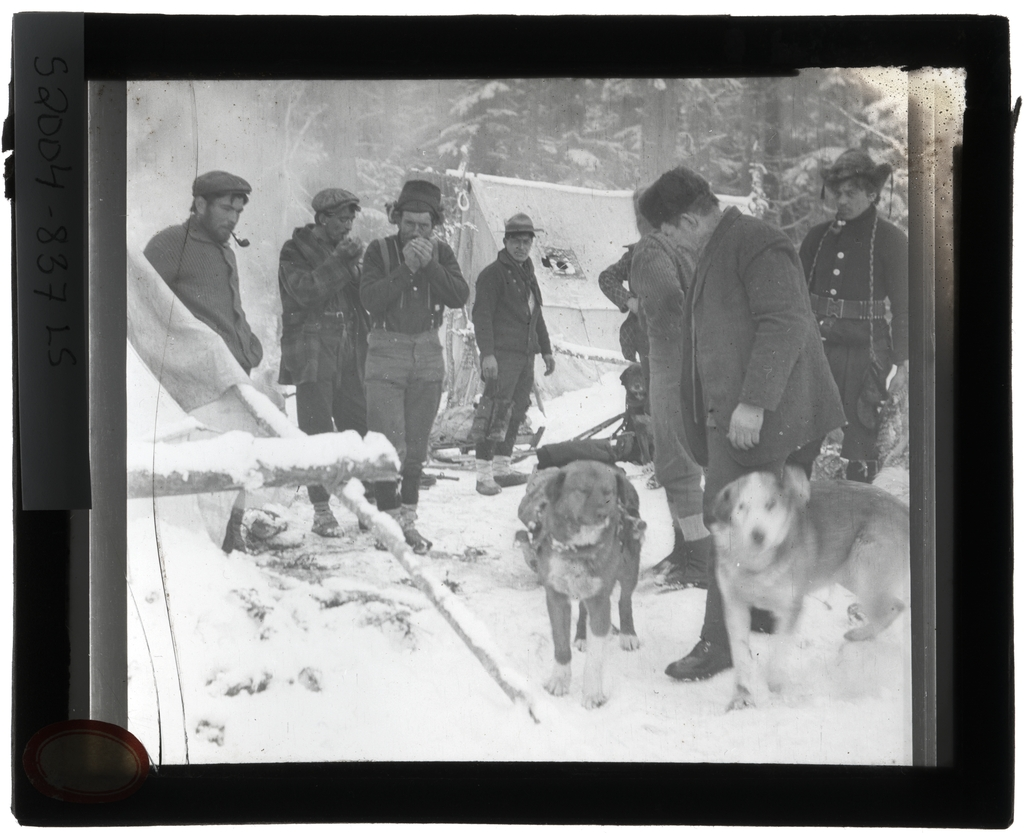
Winter Camp Scene

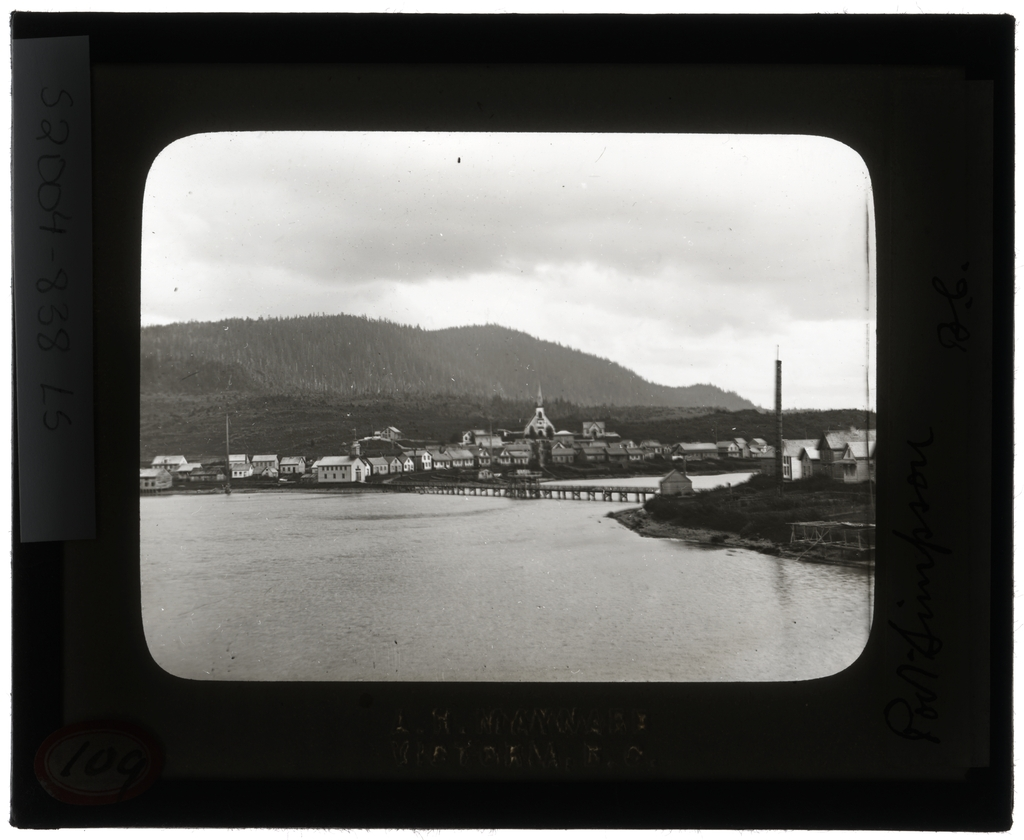
Port Simpson, British Columbia

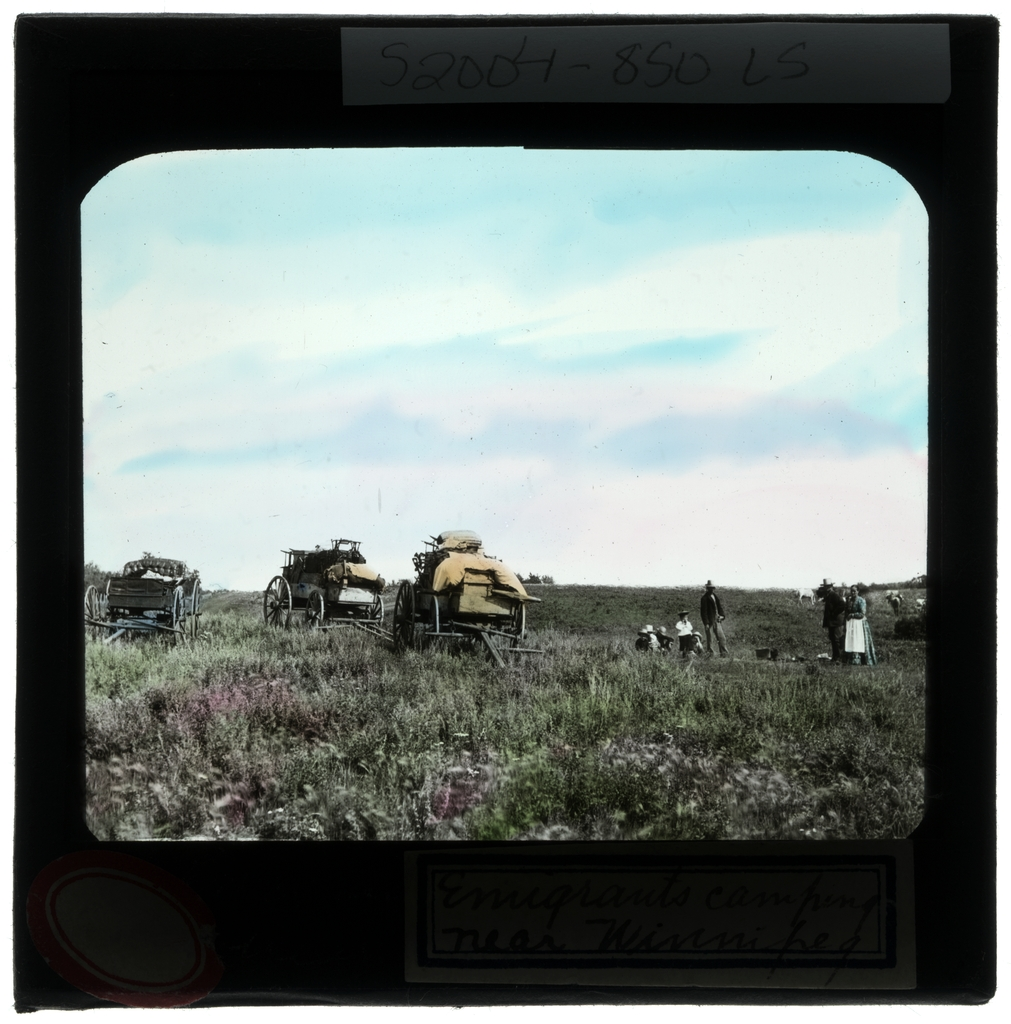
Emigrants Camping Near Winnipeg

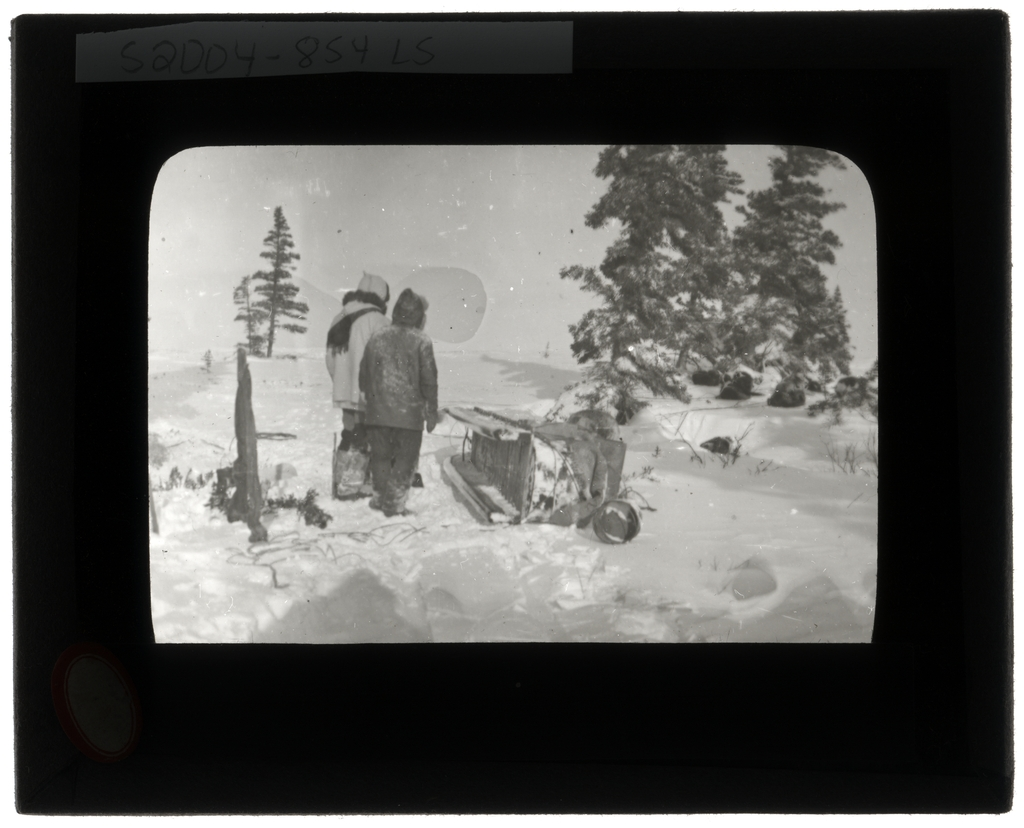
Two men with a sled on a winter trail

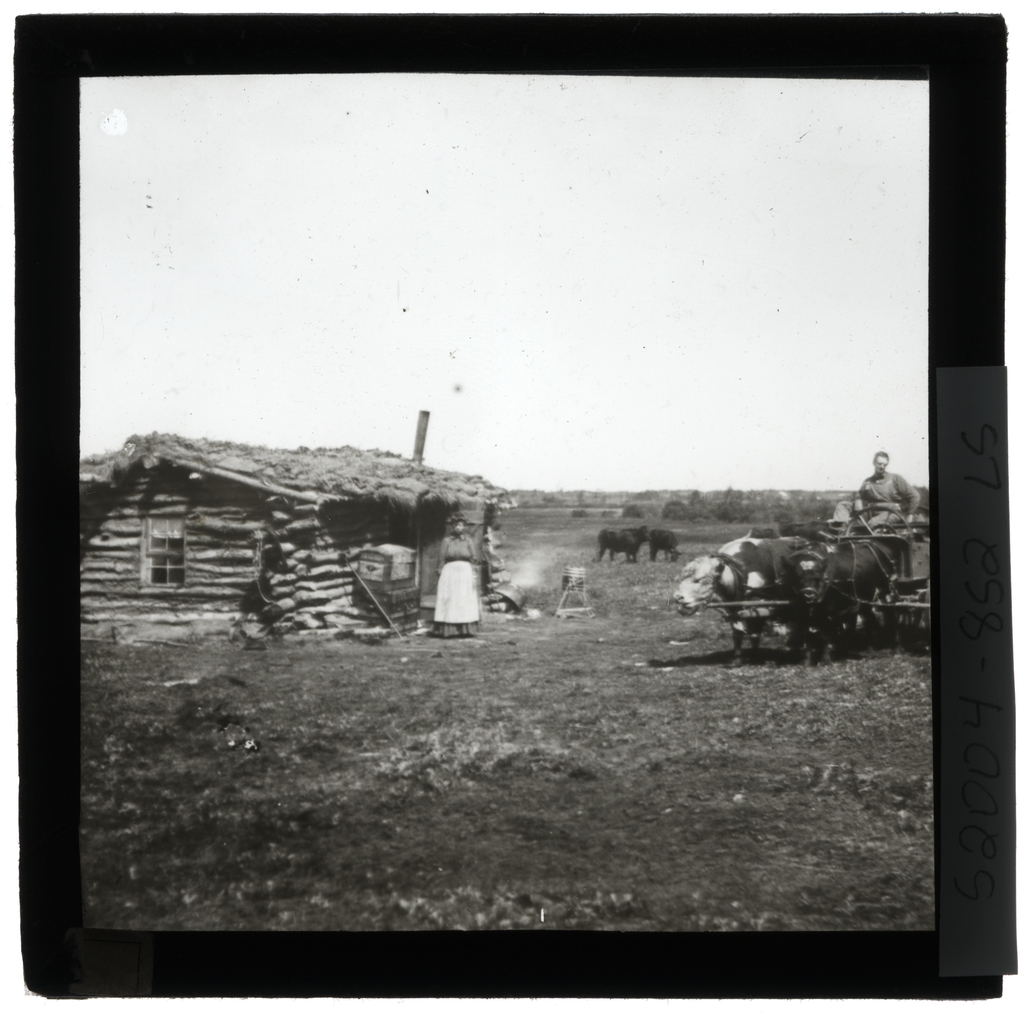
Typical Settler's House of the West of Canada

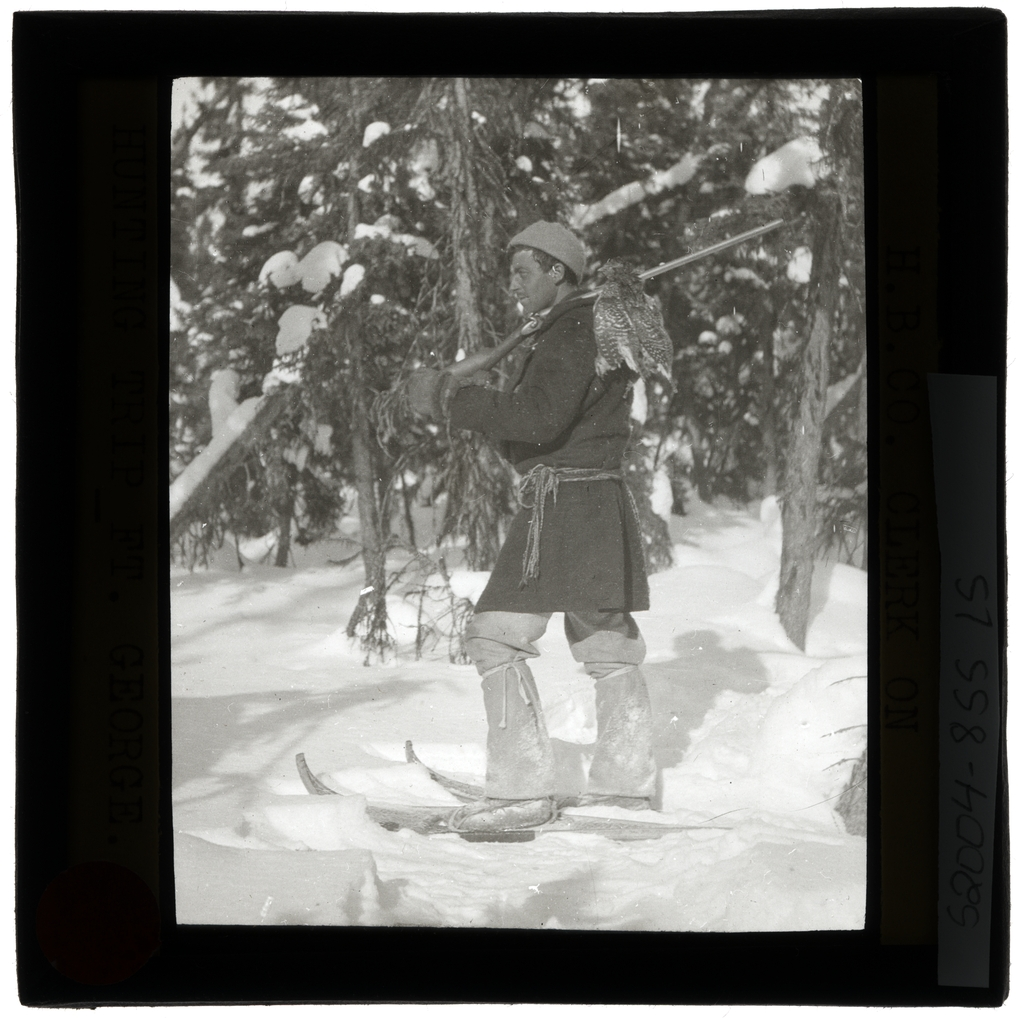
Clerk of the Hudson Bay Company on hunting trip

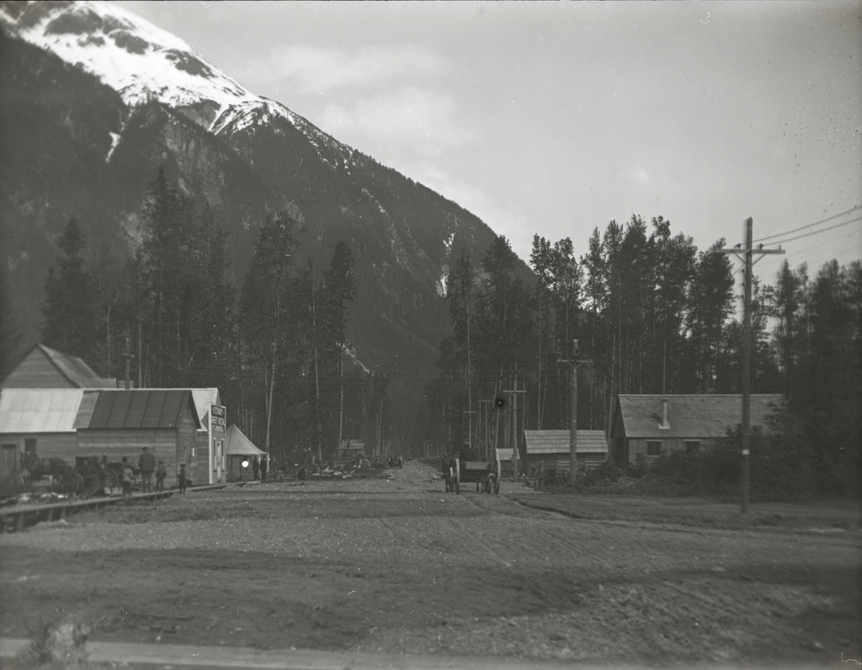
City of Stewart, British Columbia
