= Canadian Association of Petroleum Producers =

Canadian oil group

- Formation: 1992
- Merger of: Canadian Petroleum Association; Independent Petroleum Association of Canada
- Type: Advocacy group
- Location: Calgary, Alberta, Canada
- Fields: Petroleum Industry
- President and CEO: Lisa Baiton
- Website: www.capp.ca

The Canadian Association of Petroleum Producers (CAPP), with its head office in Calgary, Alberta, is a advocacy group that represents the upstream Canadian oil and natural gas industry. CAPP's members produce "90% of Canada's natural gas and crude oil" and "are an important part of a national industry with revenues of about $100 billion-a-year (CAPP 2011)."

== History ==
CAPP origins can be traced back to the Alberta Oil Operators' Association, which was founded in 1927, after the discovery of the Turner Valley Oil Field. In 1947, the Alberta Petroleum Association changed its name to the Western Canadian Petroleum Association, and In 1952, the Western Canada Petroleum Association amalgamated with the Saskatchewan Operators' Association and adopted the name Canadian Petroleum Association.

At a meeting on December 9, 1952, the CPA drafted a new constitution which outlined the objectives of the organization as follows:

- to establish better understanding between the petroleum and natural gas industry and the public
- to encourage cooperation between the petroleum and natural gas industry and federal, provincial and local governments, and other authoritative bodies
- to provide a forum for the discussion of matters affecting the welfare of its members
- to foster better understanding between the Association and purposes

On June 10, 1958 the CPA opened an office in Ottawa and became "one (of) the oldest, largest and most influential lobby groups in Canada." It provided the federal government with information pertaining to the oil industry while keeping the CPA informed about political trends, government regulations and statistics. By 1965 the CPA had a membership of more than 200 members representing roughly 97 percent of all oil and gas production in Canada. In 1981, two years after the first commercial discovery at Hibernia off the coast of Newfoundland, the CPA opened an office in St. John's in cooperation with the Eastcoast Petroleum Operators' Association.

In 1992, when the Canadian Association of Petroleum Producers (CAPP) was formed, with the CPA amalgamation with the Independent Petroleum Association of Canada (IPAC) to form the Canadian Association of Petroleum Producers (CAPP), Gerry Protti was named as founding president. (Note: First Nations, landowners, ranchers and Alberta Surface Rights among others oppose the appointment of Gerry Protti as chair of the newly created regulatory group Alberta Energy Regulator which takes over responsibilities of the Energy Resources Conservation Board (ERCB) and other key institutions in terms of regulatory issues.)

According to the Federal lobbyist registry, from January to September 2012, the Canadian Association of Petroleum Producers had 178 contacts with federal officials to discuss issues such as pipelines, making it the lobby group with the most contacts that year. They lobbied on greenhouse gas regulations related to the Clean Air Act, Fisheries Act, pipeline regulation and tax credits.

== Oil industry advocacy ==
Canada's estimated total oil reserves including conventional oil were approximately 180 billion barrels (29 km^{3}), behind only Saudi Arabia and Venezuela. Canada produces approximately 2.7 million barrels (430,000 m^{3}) of crude oil a day, and 6.4 trillion cubic feet (180 km^{3}) of natural gas per year. In 2013, an IPSOS poll showed a majority (75%) of Canadians prioritize local crude before using imported oil from foreign sources, while just over one in ten (14%) 'disagree' (4% strongly/11% somewhat) and 11% have no opinion.

The 2010 Responsible Canadian Energy progress report by CAPP noted a 2% increase in the intensity of oilseeds carbon emissions. The same report noted that GHG emissions per barrel of oil sands crude produced dropped by 29% from 1990 to 2009 as a result of new operating practices and technology.

According to IHS CERA, oil sands crude has similar CO_{2} emissions to other heavy oils and is 9% more intensive than the U.S. crude supply average on a wells-to-wheels basis.

The industry employs 550,000 people and paid billions in taxes and royalties to different levels of government.

Advocacy for Oil Sands CAPP's series of meetings in 2010 in eight cities in Canada and the United States, including Vancouver, Edmonton, Ottawa, Toronto, Montreal, Washington D.C., New York and Chicago, with CAPP representatives, oil sands CEOs and 160 key stakeholders, culminated in a report entitled Dialogues published on 14 April 2011.

=== Hydraulic Fracturing ===
CAPP advocates for the use of the technology hydraulic fracturing. In 2010 released a series of voluntary Guiding Principles for Hydraulic Fracturing for Canadian natural gas producers to adhere to. The Guiding Principles of Hydraulic Fracturing were followed in 2011 by an agreed set of Six Hydraulic Fracturing Practices for: 1. Fracturing fluid additive disclosure 2. Fracturing fluid additive risk management 3. Baseline groundwater testing 4. Wellbore construction 5. Water sourcing and reuse 6. Fluid handling, transport, disposal.

== Advocacy for crude oil exports via Canada's west coast ==
CAPP supports and advocates for exports of Canadian crude oil via Canada's west coast via the Northern Gateway and the KinderMorgan TransMountain Expansion Project. In September 2011, the Asia Pacific Foundation of Canada (APF Canada) and the Canada West Foundation established the Canada-Asia Energy Futures Task Force with Kathleen (Kathy) E. Sendall, C.M., FCAE, (Note: Kathleen Sendall, is director CGG (Paris, France), Director of Enmax Corporation (Calgary, AB); Vice Chair, Alberta Innovates – Energy and Environment Solutions (Calgary, AB); Co-Chair, Canada West/Asia Pacific Foundation Task Force (Calgary, AB)." In 2013 Prime Minister Harper appointed her the Sustainable Development Advisory Council (SDAC) and the Advisory Council for Promoting Women on Boards. She advises "federal and provincial governments in the areas of climate change, carbon capture and storage, environmental legislation, and Arctic foreign policy, and recently chaired the Canadian Council of Academies Assessment Panel on the State of Industrial R&D in Canada. Previously, Ms. Sendall led Petro-Canada's North American Natural Gas Business Unit."Kathleen Sendall Biography) a former Governor and Board Chair of the Canadian Association of Petroleum Producers (CAPP) and Kevin G. Lynch, a Canadian economist and former Clerk of the Privy Council and Secretary to the Cabinet, Canada's most senior civil servant as co-chairs, to investigate a long-term Canada-Asia energy relationship. One of their recommendations was the creation of a public energy transportation corridor.

=== Criticisms and concerns ===
Opponents to the Northern Gateway , intended to permit shipping of high-carbon Canadian crude over ecologically sensitive rivers and waters to carbon-uncontrolled countries including India and China, include 61 First Nations in British Columbia.

== Advocacy for Keystone XL Pipelines expansion ==
CAPP supports and advocates for the $7-billion pipeline expansion project by the Canadian-based company TransCanada to build the Keystone XL, that would extend and expand capacity of existing pipelines, that transport crude oil from the Athabasca oil sands in northern Alberta to tidewater and to refineries in the Persian Gulf, capable of refining the heavy bitumen crude oil.

=== Criticisms and concerns ===
Nine winners of the Nobel Peace Prize, including Archbishop Desmond Tutu and the Dalai Lama, were signatories to a letter to pressure U.S. President Barack Obama to reject the $7-billion pipeline expansion project by the Canadian-based company TransCanada to build the Keystone XL.

The position of the Nobel Peace Prize winners, essentially, is that one rich nation selling increasingly heavy high-carbon oil to another sabotages any effort to reach a deal on global carbon controls, and that moves to expand this export (like Keystone XL or Northern Gateway) cause significant and direct risks to world peace, as climate victim countries become subject to chaotic weather, fighting over scarce water (especially in Southeast Asia and Africa), flooding and rising sea levels.

== Advocacy regarding GHG emissions ==
CAPP opposed the Kyoto Protocol, from which Stephen Harper withdrew Canada in December 2011. CAPP's lobbying efforts included favouring "made in Canada" approach and advocating for a carbon pricing program. In 2007 a carbon tax was implemented in Alberta, Canada's major oil and gas producing province. Supported by CAPP and in the industry, the $15/tonne carbon tax feeds a GHG emissions reduction technology fund.

By 2008, the oil sands industry contributes (approximately 3%–4%) of Canada's GHG emissions (approximately 3%–4%. By 2012, oil sands contributed 0.14% of global GHG emissions. Transportation and electricity were the largest contributors of GHG, with transportation contributing 190 Mt of CO_{2} equivalent per year (MtCO_{2}eq yr^{−1}) and electricity and heat generation: 125 MtCO_{2}eq yr^{−1}. However, by 2007 (Environment Canada 2007) cautioned that unrestricted development of the oil sands could increase its emissions and the percentage. A 2008 CAPP report argued that both the Alberta and Federal governments adopted "comparable industry GHG emissions targets in which large emitters must reduce their emissions by either improving their operation, purchasing emissions credits or investing in technology funds."

=== Criticisms and concerns ===
Canada was the first signatory nation to walk away from the Kyoto Protocol in 2012. The U.S. abandoned the Kyoto Protocol in 2001.

== CAPP initiative 2011 ==
In the summer of 2011 CAPP contacted ENV to requested a meeting with the Canadian Society for Unconventional Gas (CSUG), and officials from several government ministries, including Alberta Environment, Energy, Sustainable Resource Development (SRD), as well as the Energy Resources Conservation Board (ERCB), (now Alberta Energy Regulator) to discuss CAPP's desire to strike a committee to develop a public communications strategy focused on fracturing and water use associated with shale gas development." Senior-level government and industry officials attended the joint meeting "to develop a plan to shape public perceptions of shale gas development and water use." From Alberta Energy participants included Director of Unconventional Gas Doug Bowes, Associate Branch Head Matthew Foss, Environment and Resource Services Audrey Murray, Executive Director of Resource Development Sharla Rauschning, Assistant Deputy Minister Resource Development Policy Division Jennifer Steber. From Alberta Environment participants included, Deputy Minister Ernie Hui, Former Head of Groundwater Policy within the Water Policy Branch, now the Exec. Dir. of OH&S Policy and Program with Human Services Ross Nairne. From Sustainable Resource Development (SRD) participants included Assistant Deputy Minister Glen Selland, Executive Director, Land Management Branch Jeff Reynolds, Officials from CAPP included VP Operations David Pryce, Manager of BC Operations Brad Herald, Manager of Water and Reclamation Tara Payment. From the Canadian Society for Unconventional Gas (CSUG) CSUG (a.k.a. CSUR) participants included Vice President Kevin Heffernan.

June 8, 2011, e-mail to senior government officials from the Energy Resources Conservation Board, the arm's length regulator of the oil and gas industry in Alberta, to several meetings to produce a collaborative communications campaign on fracking strategy. On 9 June 2011 the Alberta government approved collaborative communications campaign in the minutes of their joint meeting. stating that

(Government of Alberta) agrees communication is a priority including a joint industry/GOA committee to develop similar language and terminology for discussion of shale gas issues and operations... The objective is to improve public understanding of shale gas operations and improve public knowledge and confidence. Preparation of a common background information document may be of value (when) targeted at a public audience.

— Government of Alberta, Joint meeting with CAPP held 9 June 2011

=== Criticisms and concerns ===
By 29 November 2011, the CBC and the Alberta Federation of Labour (AFL), were investigating the role played by CAPP in influencing Alberta Environment over public communications surrounding shale gas extraction, a controversial practice that has significant environmental concerns associated with it, especially when fracturing is employed. Questions were raised about the legality of private interests influencing government. Complaints were filed and dismissed.

== 2019 federal general election ==
Prior to the 2019 Canadian federal election CAPP registered as a political third party, which The Calgary Herald said was "breaking with tradition" "for the first time" to increase its advocacy efforts on behalf of the oil industry. As oil prices rose, the profits of the Alberta oil industry in 2019 experienced a $909 million profit compared to the $678 million loss in Q4 in 2018, according to Statistics Canada. By Q1 2019, operating profits of the oil industry increased by $1.6 billion. Alberta Premier Jason Kenney had said during his election campaign that he would request that the energy industry "significantly increase its advocacy efforts."

== COVID-19 pandemic ==
The Canadian Petroleum Industry faces a major crisis during the COVID-19 pandemic, as Canadian crude oil prices fell to records low. Facing dire economic prospects, CAPP intensified its lobbying efforts with the federal government. On March 27, the group sent a 13-page letter to Natural Resources minister Seamus O'Regan and other ministers to ask them to defer or waive some of the industry's regulatory obligation, to defer the development or implementation of new policies regarding the industry, and to implement policies to support the industry directly. Specifically, this meant that the Industry requests, among other things, to defer the reporting of its greenhouse gas emission, to defer the implementation of the new Methane regulation and carbon pricing, and to delay the introduction of legislation that would entrench the Declaration on the Rights of Indigenous Peoples (UNDRIP) in Canadian law.

=== Criticisms and concerns ===
Assembly of First Nations National Chief Perry Bellegarde wrote a letter to CAPP President and CEO Tim McMillan telling him to back off from advocating for the indefinite delay of the implementation of UNDRIP in Canada. Macmillan responded by affirming CAPP's support of UNDRIP, but maintaining that such legislation shouldn't be adopted during the pandemic because of the government's limited ability to hold consultations during this time.

== Selected CAPP publications ==
- CAPP Report: Gas Use by the Canadian Oil Sands Industry (Report). Natural Gas. Canadian Association of Petroleum Producers (CAPP). December 2007. p. 22.
- CAPP 2008 Facing our Challenges-2007 Stewardship Report (Report). Canadian Association of Petroleum Producers. 2008.
- Overview: Water Use in Canada's Oil Sands (Report). Canadian Association of Petroleum Producers (CAPP). September 2010. p. 1.
- GHG 101 (Report). Canadian Association of Petroleum Producers (CAPP). 2009. Archived from the original on 2013-05-25.
- Crude Oil Forecast, Markets & Pipeline Expansions 101 (Report). Canadian Association of Petroleum Producers (CAPP). June 2010. Archived from the original on 2013-05-25. p. 30
- Overview: Greenhouse Gas Emission in Canada's Oil Sands (Report). Canadian Association of Petroleum Producers (CAPP). August 2010. Archived from the original on 2013-05-25. p. 1
- Report of the Dialogues on the Oil Sands: Engaging Canadians and Americans (Report). Calgary, Alberta: Canadian Association of Petroleum Producers (CAPP). 14 April 2011. Full text on-line report
- Canada's Oil Sands Fact Book (Report). Canadian Association of Petroleum Producers (CAPP). Retrieved February 2022.

== See also ==
- American Petroleum Institute (API)
