= Energy and Utilities Board =

Governing body

The Energy and Utilities Board (EUB) was the governing body of the energy industry in the province of Alberta, Canada. Previously known as the Alberta Energy and Utilities Board (AEUB), the EUB was reorganized on 1 January 2008 into two separate regulatory bodies: the Energy Resources Conservation Board (ERCB), which regulates the oil and gas industry (later reorganized as Alberta Energy Regulator), and the Alberta Utilities Commission (AUC), which regulates the utilities industry.

== History ==
1995: The Alberta Energy and Utilities Board (EUB) was created.

The Public Utilities Board and the Energy Resources and Conservation Board (previously the Petroleum and Natural Gas Conservation Board) merged to create the Alberta Energy and Utilities Board (EUB) in order to provide a more streamlined and efficient regulatory process.
