= Energy Resources Conservation Board =

Independent, quasi-judicial regulatory agency overview
- Formed: 1971
- Preceding agencies: 1938; Alberta Energy and Utilities Board (EUB) Alberta Utilities Commission
- Dissolved: 2013
- Superseding independent, quasi-judicial regulatory agency: Alberta Energy Regulator
- Jurisdiction: Province of Alberta
- Headquarters: Edmonton, Alberta
- Motto: to ensure that the discovery, development, and delivery of Alberta's energy resources took place in a manner that was fair, responsible and in the public interest
- Parent department: Alberta Ministry of Energy
- Key document: Responsible Energy Development Act

The Energy Resources Conservation Board (ERCB) was an independent, quasi-judicial agency of the Government of Alberta. It regulated the safe, responsible, and efficient development of Alberta's energy resources: oil, natural gas, oil sands, coal, and pipelines. Led by eight Board members, the ERCB's team of engineers, geologists, technicians, economists, and other professionals served Albertans from thirteen locations across the province.

The ERCB's mission was to ensure that the discovery, development, and delivery of Alberta's energy resources took place in a manner that was fair, responsible and in the public interest.

The ERCB adjudicated and regulated matters related to energy within Alberta to ensure that the development, transportation, and monitoring of the province's energy resources were in the public interest. The Board provided this assurance of the public interest through its activities in the application and hearing process, regulation, monitoring, and surveillance and enforcement.

The information and knowledge responsibility of the Board included the collection, storage, analysis, appraisal, dissemination and stakeholder awareness of information. Open access to information developed awareness, understanding and responsible behavior and allowed the Board and stakeholders to make informed decisions about energy and utility matters. This responsibility would result in the Board discharging its advisory role with respect to matters under the jurisdiction of the Board.

The Government of Alberta owns about 80% of the province's mineral rights, such as oil, natural gas, coal, and the oil sands. In other words, most resources are owned by the people of Alberta through their government. While private companies can develop these resources, the ERCB was authorized by the government to protect the public's interest relating to the discovery, development, and delivery of these resources. Regulation was needed so that non-renewable resources were produced in a safe, responsible, and efficient manner, without waste.

The ERCB also ensured that everyone affected by development had a chance to be heard. When conflicts regarding development remained unresolved between companies and landowners, the ERCB worked to settle the issues in a fair and balanced manner.

In 1996, the Alberta Geological Survey (AGS) joined the ERCB. AGS assisted the ERCB by providing data, information, knowledge and advice about the geology of Alberta.

== History ==
Alberta's first energy regulatory body was created in 1938. A succession of agencies led to the new ERCB being established 1 January 2008, as a result of the realignment of the Alberta Energy and Utilities Board (EUB) into the ERCB and the Alberta Utilities Commission. The ERCB also includes the Alberta Geological Survey.

In October 2008, ERCB was named one of Alberta's Top Employers by Mediacorp Canada Inc., which was announced by the Calgary Herald and the Edmonton Journal.

=== Alberta Energy Regulator ===
Alberta Energy Regulator is a corporation created by the Responsible Energy Development Act passed on 10 December 2012 and proclaimed on 17 June 2013, in the Alberta Legislature, operating at arm's length from the Government of Alberta, under an appointed board of directors headed by Chair, Gerry Protti and CEO Jim Ellis, appointed by Energy Minister Ken Hughes. On 17 June 2013, all regulatory functions previously carried out by the Energy Resources Conservation Board were taken over by the Alberta Energy Regulator. (Note: "Alberta’s energy regulator has a new name, new responsibilities and new leadership. After sitting on the news of a recent spill for 12 days, it apparently also needs new policies about transparency. The Alberta Energy Regulator, formerly the Energy Resources Conservation Board, has a tough act to follow when it comes to alerting the public about pipeline ruptures and other incidents that cause hydrocarbons to soak the landscape. Its federal counterpart, the National Energy Board, sent the message last week that the bar has been raised (Globe and Mail 17 June 2013).")

Alberta Energy Regulator is "100 per cent funded by industry and is authorized to collect funds through an administrative fee levied on oil and gas wells, oil sands mines, and coal mines. The industry-funded model is commonly used by regulatory agencies from various sectors across North America." AER has "an annual budget of more than $165 million, more than "1000 staff working in 13 locations across Alberta." Alberta Energy Regulator "regulates approximately - 181,000 active wells, 27,800 oil facilities and 20,000 gas facilities, and 405,000 kilometres (km) of pipelines." AER also "considers some 36 800 applications for energy development every year."

In December 2012, the Responsible Energy Development Act passed in the Alberta Legislature. Alberta Energy Regulator is mandated under the Act, to direct and oversee "the orderly transition from the Energy Resources Conservation Act to the Responsible Energy Development Act. Under this act, the newly formed Alberta Energy Regulator, will "bring together the regulatory functions from the Energy Resources Conservation Board and the Ministry of Environment and Sustainable Resource Development into a one-stop shop." The Alberta Energy Regulator is now "responsible for all projects from application to reclamation." They will respond to project proponents, landowners and industry regarding energy regulations in Alberta. The Alberta Energy Regulator was phased in during June 2013. Responsible Energy Development Act gave the Alberta Energy Regulator "the authority to administer the Public Lands Act, the Environmental Protection and Enhancement Act and the Water Act, with regards to energy development." The Alberta Energy Regulator will enforce environmental laws and issue environmental and water permits, responsibilities formerly the mandate of Alberta Environment. (Note: Maximum fines under the Responsible Energy Development Act are limited to $500 000 or less for a corporation and $50,000 or less for an individual.)

Gerry Protti, appointed by Energy Minister Ken Hughes, on 18 June 2013, as chair of the Alberta Energy Regulator (AER), that will regulate oil, gas and coal development in Alberta, was a former executive with Encana, the founding president of the Canadian Association of Petroleum Producers (CAPP) and spent many years as lobbyist for the Energy Policy Institute of Canada. Jim Ellis, a former deputy minister in environment and energy, was appointed as CEO by the Lieutenant Governor in Council.

In the past the Energy Resources Conservation Board and Alberta Environment conducted investigations differently. Alberta Surface Rights Group, the United Landowners of Alberta, First Nations, farmers and ranchers have expressed concerns about the streamlining of regulatory processes that may benefit oil and gas industries at their expense.

According to their brochure the Alberta Energy Regulator "ensures the safe, efficient, orderly, and environmentally responsible development of hydrocarbon resources over their entire life cycle. This includes allocating and conserving water resources, managing public lands, and protecting the environment while providing economic benefits for all Albertans."

== Scope ==
The ERCB regulated the safe, responsible, and efficient development of oil, natural gas, oil sands, and coal, and as well as the pipelines to move the resources to market.

Regulation was done through two core functions: adjudication and regulation, and information and knowledge. ERCB approval must have been given at almost every step of an energy project's life.

== Governance ==
To maintain its autonomous structure, the ERCB answered directly to the Executive Council (Cabinet) of Alberta through the Minister of Energy, but it made its formal decisions independently in accordance with the six statutes it administers.

== Organization structure ==
The ERCB was led by a Board of eight people: a Chairman and Board Members. Supporting the Chairman and Board Members was the Executive Committee, and approximately 900 staff who worked in eight main branches:

=== Applications ===
This branch, made up of three groups, provided a streamlined approach to processing some 40 000 energy development applications each year. The Facilities Group handled project reviews, audits, and approvals related to new or modified oil and gas facilities, such as wells, pipelines, batteries, and gas plants. The Resource Group dealt with applications and issues related to development and conservation projects for oil, gas, and coal. The Business Operations and Development Group managed the coordination of administrative support, approvals development, planning, objections, and hearings.

=== Field surveillance and operations ===
This branch provided technical and operational expertise in the development, application, and enforcement of regulatory requirements for conventional and nonconventional resources. The branch ensured that oil and gas operations are conducted in a safe and responsible manner through incident response, resource conservation, protection of the environment, and industry liability management. Operating from Field Centres across Alberta, field staff inspected construction, operation, and abandonment operations at oil, gas, and oil sands facilities and respond to emergencies and public concerns on a 24-hour basis.

=== Corporate support ===
This branch incorporated several groups. Human Resources provides services and programs to ensure that a competent and committed workforce was in place to achieve ERCB goals and objectives. The Communications Group developed strategic communication, consultation strategies and delivers related media, Web site, and document services to keep staff and stakeholders informed about ERCB activities. Administrative Services provided building, library, and printing services.

=== Finance ===
This branch provided revenue and expenditure management and administration of the industry funding levy. In addition, staff coordinated the preparation of the ERCB's three-year business plan and performance reporting.

=== Information and systems services ===
This branch was responsible for ERCB information systems, support, and technological infrastructure, with a focus on new ways to deliver electronic commerce. Another core area was the collection and dissemination of energy resource information, including oil and gas production. This information was also used to determine provincial royalties, well records, regulatory publications, maps, and various energy databases.

=== Law ===
This branch provided a wide range of legal advice and services to the organization, with a focus on procedural fairness and objectivity. Its responsibilities included application and regulatory policy, hearings, proceedings, related internal and external consultations, and the formulation of energy regulations and legislation. The branch administered intervener funding and led a key advisory committee that advises the Board on decisions and policy matters.

=== Geology, environmental science, and economics ===
This branch maintained an integrated and current inventory of Alberta's subsurface energy, mineral, and other resources in a geological framework. It provided knowledge, advice, and forecasts about the states of earth-energy resource development in the context of Alberta's environment, economy, and society. The branch also developed and supported regulatory processes and best practices to conserve earth-energy resources, maintains environmental quality, assures public safety, and guides informed risk taking in regulatory and policy decisions.

=== Oil Sands ===
The Oil Sands Branch had overall responsibility for how the ERCB regulated oil sands activities in Alberta. The branch comprised the Mineable Oil Sands Group, which looked after oil sands developments that use mining recovery technology as well as bitumen upgrading, and the In Situ Oil Sands Group, which focused on developments using recovery technology involving subsurface or in situ recovery methods. Collaborating with other ERCB branches, the Oil Sands Branch took the lead on processing applications, conducting surveillance and enforcement of approved projects, and carrying out geological assessments as they apply to the oil sands.

In their 2012 report ECRB cautioned that oil sands operators failed to convert their tailings ponds into deposits suitable for reclamation in a timely fashion, as proposed in their project applications. "The volume of fluid tailings, and the area required to hold fluid tailings, continued to grow, and the reclamation of tailings ponds was further delayed." ECRB follows the industry wide directive, Directive 074, the first of its kind, which sets out the "industry-wide requirements for tailings management," requiring "operators to commit resources to research, develop, and implement fluid tailings reduction technologies and to commit to tailings management and progressive reclamation as operational priorities that are integrated with mine planning and bitumen production activities." The Government of Alberta is setting up a Tailings Management Framework to complement and expand Directive 074's policies to "ensure that fluid fine tailings are reclaimed as quickly as possible and that current inventories are reduced."

On 12 June 2013 the Regional Municipality of Wood Buffalo after many days of heavy rain, declared a state of emergency. The flood conditions lasted from June 10–18, 2013. It was the first of many communities to do so in Alberta during the 2013 floods. Wood Buffalo authorities organised evacuations from some areas and placed others in boil water advisories as local waterways, such as the Hangingstone River, rose to dangerously high levels. (Note: Communities affected included In Northeast Alberta between June 10–18, 2013 sections of communities such as Anzac and Fort McMurray were also flooded)

== Energy applications ==
An application was a request by a company for ERCB approval—in the form of a licence, order, permit, or approval—for an energy project. Most energy-related projects require ERCB approval. Each year tens of thousands of applications were reviewed and approved by the ERCB.

The ERCB also played a vital environmental protection role by reviewing flaring permits, oilfield waste disposal facilities, drilling waste practices, and emergency response plans.

ERCB approval for a facility or project was considered to be routine if an application was complete, there were no landowner objections, and the company applying had met all technical, safety, public consultation, and environmental requirements. The turnaround time for a complete and well-prepared routine application could be as short as one day.

Some projects required input from other government departments. The ERCB passed such applications to Alberta Environment, which handles distribution to other departments. This "one-window" approach meant that applicants did not have to go to each government department for individual review and approval. The general rule was that each government department checks that a specific proposal meets its own regulations and standards and then forwards any deficiencies or concerns to the ERCB via Alberta Environment.

Nonroutine applications took more time—weeks, or even months—to process if there were landowner objections, community and environmental concerns, or objections from competing companies. Objections to applications may also have been resolved through facilitation, mediation, or negotiated settlements approved by the Board. However, any unresolved matter or objection related to an application may have proceeded to an ERCB hearing.

== Major publications ==
ERCB. 2011-06. "ST98-2011 Alberta’s Energy Reserves 2010 and Supply/Demand Outlook 2011–2020"

ERCB. 2011-04. "Big Reserves, Big Responsibility: Developing Alberta’s Oil Sands"

ERCB. 2009. "Directive 074: Tailings Performance Criteria and Requirements for Oil Sands Mining Schemes."

ERCB. 2008. "Directive 073: Requirements for Inspection and Compliance of Oil Sands Mining and Processing Plant Operations in the Oil Sands Mining Area."

== Hearings ==
An ERCB hearing was a formal process that provided an important opportunity for different points of view about an energy project to be aired in a fair and orderly forum. A hearing allowed for an open, public testing of technical, environmental, social, and economic evidence from those involved. The process ensured that all relevant arguments for and against the energy facility project are heard.

ERCB hearings were held when the ERCB received an objection from a person who may have been directly and adversely affected by a proposed project. Applications filed may have created community concern or a need for more information; however, these matters were often settled through an Appropriate Dispute Resolution (ADR) process. When matters were settled through ADR or there were no public concerns and objections, there was no need for a hearing. The Board would also dismiss objections if the person does not appear to be directly or adversely affected.

The ERCB mailed a Notice of Hearing to inform people and organizations affected by an application about the hearing. The Notice of Hearing may have been published in daily and/or weekly newspapers.

Hearing notices were available on the ERCB Web site. Companies involved in large projects usually held an open house to explain their proposed project, answer citizens' questions, and address the community's concerns.

The Notice of Hearing provided interested parties with the following information:

- date, time, and location of the hearing,
- application number and nature of the application,
- a contact for the company that filed the application,
- ERCB information,
- the due date for filing objections or interventions, and
- a statement that all material relating to the proceeding is subject to Alberta's Freedom of Information and Protection of Privacy legislation.

An ERCB hearing followed a formal process to ensure that everyone had a say:

- Opening Remarks: The panel chair explains the purpose of the hearing and introduces the members of the panel and all ERCB staff in the room. Then participants in the hearing register an appearance, coming forward and introducing themselves.
- Preliminary Matters: Procedural and legal matters are presented, such as adjournment requests or the scheduling of a specific witness at a particular time.
- Applicant (Application): The applicant presents its case and may question its own witnesses. Then interveners, ERCB staff, and the Board panel may cross-examine those witnesses. Once cross-examinations are complete, the applicant may question the witnesses again to clarify any issues that arose.
- Interveners: Interveners next present their cases in the same order they registered. After the intervener gives direct evidence, the lawyer for the applicant may cross-examine, followed by the other interveners who wish to cross-examine. ERCB staff and panel members may then cross-examine the intervener. Following cross-examination, the intervener is entitled to clarify any matters that arose.
- Rebuttal Evidence by Applicant: Once the above process is complete with all the interveners and their witnesses, the applicant may submit additional evidence to address new points raised by interveners' evidence.
- Final Argument or Summation: Participants may provide an explanation of what are the important aspects of the issues involved and what decisions they feel the panel should make. The applicant may respond to interveners' arguments.
- Closing of Hearing: The panel chair announces the hearing is completed and that the decision of the panel and the reasons for it will be given at a later date.
