= Canada Water Act =

Statute of the Government of Canada

Parliament of Canada
- Long title: An Act to provide for the management of the water resources of Canada, including research and the planning and implementation of programs relating to the conservation, development and utilization of water resources
- Citation: R.S.C., 1985, c. C-11
- Royal assent: September 30, 1970
- Status: Current legislation

The Canada Water Act (French: Loi sur les ressources en eau du Canada) is a statute of the Government of Canada. It specifies the framework for cooperation between the provinces and territories of Canada and for the development and use of Canada's water resources. This includes research, planning and implementation of programs relating to the conservation of Canadian waterways.

== Description ==
The Act recognizes the increased use and development of Canadian water resources and the connection between Canada's water resources and the health, well-being, and prosperity of Canadians.

The Act received royal assent on September 30, 1970.
