= History of the petroleum industry in Canada (oil sands and heavy oil) =

Canada's oil sands and heavy oil resources are among the world's largest petroleum deposits. They include the oil sands of northern Alberta, and the heavy crude oil reservoirs that surround the small city of Lloydminster, which sits on the border between Alberta and Saskatchewan. The extent of these resources is well known, but better technologies to produce oil from them are still being developed.

Because of the high cost of extraction and refining, they tend to come on stream later in the cycle of petroleum resource development in a given producing region. This is because oil companies tend to extract the light, high-value oils first. The more difficult-to-extract resources are developed later, generally during periods of a relatively high price of oil in world markets, such as the extended period of higher prices which began with the 1973 oil crisis.

Experimentation for producing these deposits began at about the same time as drilling for conventional light oil in Western Canada. Although the oil sands deposits were first found in the 18th century, oil production from the Suncor and Syncrude oil sands plants did not become profitable until well after the 1979 energy crisis, partly due to production costs and partly due to the National Energy Program keeping prices for oil artificially low, for domestic consumers (but not for exports), from 1980 to 1985.

Heavy oil, oil sands, and the synthetic crude produced from them have accounted for the majority of Canada's oil production for more than two decades. As of 2023, they comprised nearly 75% of Canada's oil output.

== Defining the resources ==
Much of Canada's petroleum effort has focused on producing oil from the oil sands (incorrectly referred to, in the late 19th and early 20th century, as tar sands, for its minor resemblance to tar) of northern Alberta. To appreciate these resources, it is important to understand a simple concept from chemistry and physics: the "gravity" of crude oil and natural gas liquids. The oil industry measures the weight of oil on terms of an artificial scale known as API (American Petroleum Institute) gravity. Ten degrees API is the gravity of water. Light crude oil has an API gravity higher than 31.1°, medium oil has an API gravity between 22.3 and 31.1°, heavy crude oil has an API gravity below 22.3°, while bitumen typically has an API of 8-10°.

Gravity refers to the weight spectrum of hydrocarbons, which increases with the ratio of hydrogen to carbon in a chemical compound's molecule. Methane (CH_{4}) - the simplest form of natural gas - has four hydrogen atoms for every carbon atom. It has light gravity, and takes the form of a gas at normal temperatures and pressures. The next heavier hydrocarbon, ethane, has the chemical formula C_{2}H_{6} and is a slightly denser gas. Gases, of course, have no gravity at atmospheric temperatures and pressures.

Organic compounds combining carbon and oxygen are many in number. Those with more carbon atoms per hydrogen atom are heavier and denser. Most hydrocarbons are liquid under standard conditions, with greater viscosity associated with greater gravity.

Heavy oil and bitumen, which have far more carbon mass than hydrogen, are heavy, black, sticky and either slow-pouring or so close to being solid that they will not pour at all unless heated. Although the dividing line is fuzzy, the term heavy oil refers to slow-pouring heavy hydrocarbon mixtures. Bitumen refers to mixtures with the consistency of cold molasses that pour at room temperatures with agonizing slowness. Oils with high viscosity and heavy gravity do not float on water, but sink.

In the oil sands, this thick, black gunk is mixed with sand and many chemical impurities such as sulfur; these must be separated from the bitumen for the oil to be useful. This can be done by surface mining and processing and by underground in situ techniques.

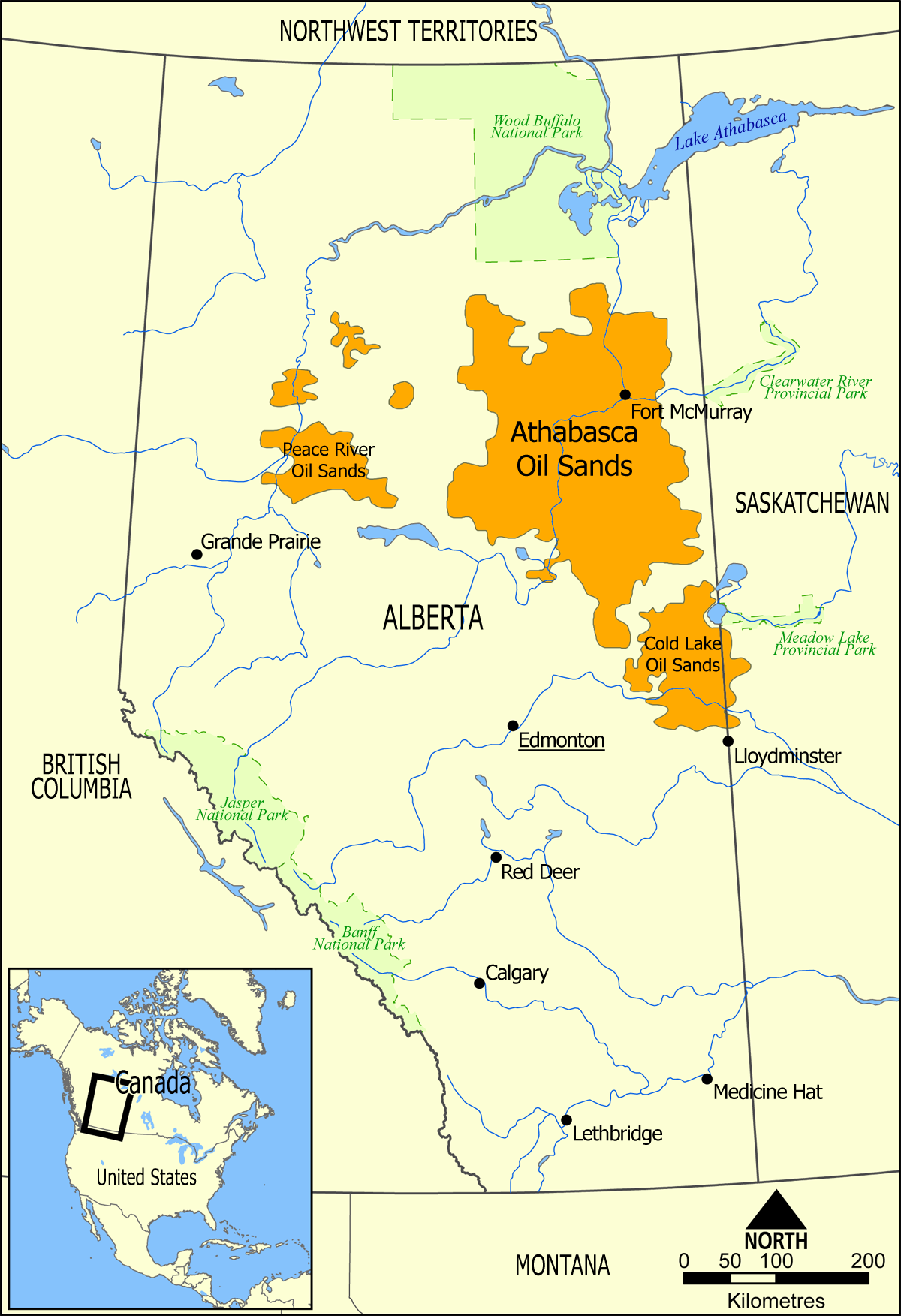
Oil sands deposits in Alberta, Canada.

Fields in northern Alberta include four major deposits which underlie almost 70,000 square kilometres of land. The volume of bitumen in those sands dwarfs the light oil reserves of the entire Middle East. One of those deposits, the Athabasca oil sands, is the world's largest known crude oil resource.

=== Westward expansion and first British colonial accounts of the oil sands ===
The first recorded mention of Canada's bitumen deposits goes back to June 12, 1719. According to an entry in the York Factory journal, on that day a Cree man, Wa-Pa-Sun, brought a sample of oil sand to Henry Kelsey of the Hudson's Bay Company. When fur trader Peter Pond travelled down the Clearwater River to Athabasca in 1778, he saw the deposits and wrote of "springs of bitumen that flow along the ground." A decade later, Alexander Mackenzie saw Chipewyan communities using oil from the oil sands to caulk their canoes.

In 1875, John Macoun of the Geological Survey also noted the presence of the oil sands. Later reports by Robert Bell and later by D.G. McConnell, also of the Geological Survey, led to drilling some test holes. In 1893, Parliament voted $7,000 for drilling. This first commercial effort to exploit the oil sands probably hoped to find free oil at the base of the sands, as drillers had in the gum beds of southern Ontario a few decades earlier. Although the Survey's three wells failed to find oil, the second was noteworthy for quite another reason.

Drilled at a site called Pelican Portage, the well blew out at 235 metres after encountering a high-pressure gas zone. According to drilling contractor A.W. Fraser:

The roar of the gas could be heard for three miles or more. Soon it had completely dried the hole, and was blowing a cloud of dust fifty feet into the air. Small nodules of iron pyrites, about the size of a walnut, were blown out of the hole with incredible velocity. We could not see them going, but could hear them crack against the top of the derrick ... There was danger that the men would be killed if struck by these missiles.

Fraser's crew unsuccessfully tried to kill the well by casing it, then abandoned the well for that year. They returned in 1898 to finish the job, but again they failed. In the end, they simply left the well blowing wild. Natural gas flowed from the well at a rate of some 250,000 cubic metres per day until 1918. In that year a crew led by geologist S.E. Slipper and C.W. Dingman finally shut in the well.

These wells helped establish that the bitumen resource in the area was huge. There was now clear recognition of the commercial potential of the oil sands, and a long period of exploration and experimentation followed. The point of this research was to find a method of getting oil out of the oil sands at a reasonable price.

Alfred Hammerstein, who claimed to be a German count (historically there are von Hammerstein barons, but not counts), was one of the colourful early players in the oil sands. He said he encountered Fort McMurray area bitumen deposits en route to the Klondike, and decided to stay and turn his interest from gold to the oil sands. In 1906 he drilled at the mouth of the Horse River, but struck salt instead of oil. He continued working in the area, however, in 1907 Hammerstein made a presentation to a Senate committee investigating the potential of the oil sands:

I have all my money put into (the Athabasca oil sands), and there is other peoples' money in it, and I have to be loyal. As to whether you can get petroleum in merchantable quantities ... I have been taking in machinery for about three years. Last year I placed about $50,000 worth of machinery in there. I have not brought it in for ornamental purposes, although it does look nice and home-like. His syndicate received the first (and only) clear title to oil sands lands in 1910, and he was elected to the Canadian Petroleum Hall of Fame one hundred years later. Otherwise, history has not been kind to this man, who was a bit of a dreamer, a lot of a con. According to one historian, "His venture was marked by wild speculation, fraud and ultimate failure." Quite poor, he died in 1941 – probably in his seventies – in St. Albert, Alberta.

{{Hammerstein (1870–1941), who arrived in the region in 1897, promoted the Athabaska tar sands for over forty years, taking photos with descriptive titles such as "Tar Sands and Flowing Asphaltum in the Athabasca District," that are now in the National Library and National Archives Canada. Photos of the Athabaska tar sands were also featured in Canadian writer and adventurer, Agnes Deans Cameron's, best-selling book entitled The New North: Being Some Account of a Woman’s Journey through Canada to the Arctic which recounted her 10,000 mile-round trip to the Arctic Ocean. Following this journey and the publication of her book, she travelled extensively as lecturer, with magic lantern slides of her Kodak images, promoting immigration to western Canada at Oxford, Cambridge, St. Andrew's University and the Royal Geographical Society. Her photographs were reproduced in 2011–2012 in an exhibit at the Canadian Museum of Civilization in Ottawa, Canada. Cameron was particularly enthusiastic about the Athabaska region and the Athabaska tar sands which included photos of Hammerstein's oil drill works along the Athabasca River. "While the Count was unsuccessful drilling for "elephant pools of oil," Cameron's book and its images... made her a media celebrity." "In all Canada there is no more interesting stretch of waterway than that upon which we are entering. An earth-movement here has created a line of fault clearly visible for seventy or eighty miles along the river-bank, out of which oil oozes at frequent intervals. [...] Tar there is [...] in plenty. [...] It oozes from every fissure, and into some bituminous tar well we can poke a twenty-foot pole and find no resistance.

== Surface extraction ==
In 1913, Dr. S.C. Ells, an engineer with the federal department of mines, began investigating the economic possibilities of the oils sands. It was then that the idea of using the sands as road paving material was born. In 1915, Dr. Ells laid three road surfaces on sections of 82nd Street in Edmonton. Materials used included bitulithic, bituminous concrete and sheet asphalt mixtures. A report, ten years later, by a city engineer stated that the surface remained in excellent condition. McMurray asphalt also saw use on the grounds of the Alberta Legislature, on the highway in Jasper Park and elsewhere in Alberta.

Although private contractors also mined oil sand as a paving material, the proposition was not economic. Fort McMurray (the community closest to the near-surface deposits) was small and far from market, and transportation costs were high.

=== Pioneers ===
Researchers began to look for ways to extract the bitumen from the sand. The Alberta Research Council set up two pilot plants in Edmonton and a third at the Clearwater River. These plants were part of a successful project (led by the Research Council's Dr. Karl A. Clark) to develop a hot water process to separate the oil from the sands. In 1930, the Fort McMurray plant actually used the process to produce three car loads of oil.

Abasand: At about that time two American promoters, Max Ball and B.O. Jones from Denver, entered the oil sands scene. They reportedly had a secret recovery method known as the McClay process, and they claimed substantial financial backing. They negotiated leases with the federal and Alberta governments and also bought the McMurray plant of the Alberta Research Council. In 1935, Abasand Oils Limited, Ball's American-backed operating company, started construction of a new plant west of Waterways.

Under the agreement with the government, the plant was to be in operation by September 1, 1936. But forest fires and failure of equipment suppliers to meet delivery dates delayed completion. The agreement called for mining 45,000 tonnes of sands in 1937 and 90,000 tonnes each year after 1938. The 1,555-hectare lease carried a rental of $2.47 per hectare per year. There was to be royalties of $0.063 per cubic metre on production for the first five years, and $0.31 per cubic metre thereafter.

Mining at the Abasand plant began May 19, 1941. By the end of September, 18,475 tonnes of oil sand had produced 2,690 cubic metres of oil, but in November fire destroyed the plant. Rebuilt on a larger scale, it was fully operational in June 1942.

In 1943, the federal government decided to aid oil sands development, and took over the Abasand plant. The federal researchers concluded that the hot water process was uneconomic because of the extensive heat loss and proposed a "cold" water process. But work at the plant came to an end with a disastrous fire in 1945. In July 1943, International Bitumen Company reorganized as Oil Sands Limited.

Bitumount: Between 1930 and 1955, the International Bitumen Company Limited under R.C. Fitzsimmons and later Lloyd Champion operated a small-scale plant at Bitumount. When the Alberta government became disenchanted with federal efforts in the oil sands and decided to build its own experimental plant at Bitumount, the province engaged Oil Sands Limited to construct the plant.

The company agreed to buy the plant within a period of ten years for the original investment of $250,000. The cost of the plant was $750,000, however. A legal claim against Oil Sands Limited resulted in the province taking possession of the plant and property at Bitumount. The plant consisted of a separation unit, a dehydrating unit and a refinery. The plant conducted successful tests using the Clark hot water process in 1948/49 then closed, partly because the recent Leduc discoveries had lessened interest in the oil sands.

=== Great Canadian Oil Sands ===
In 1962, Great Canadian Oil Sands Limited (GCOS) received approval from the Alberta government to build and operate a 10,000 cubic metre per day plant near Fort McMurray. The plant was to produce 240 tonnes of sulfur and 900 tonnes of coke per day as by-products. Because at that time the industry was having difficulties marketing its oil, the provincial government established a policy that would limit oil sands production. According to this policy, synthetic oil from the oil sands could supplement conventional oil sales, but could not displace it. Oil from the plant could not exceed 5 per cent of total volumes in markets already supplied by conventional Alberta oil.

Financial difficulties delayed construction of the GCOS plant until a new investor - Sun Oil Company's Canadian subsidiary, today known as Suncor - was found. The capacity of the proposed plant increased to 7,500 cubic metres per day and the cost escalated from $122 to $190 million. The larger plant received approval in 1964 and went into commercial production in September 1967. The final cost: $250 million.

During the opening ceremonies for the plant, Sun Oil Company chairman J. Howard Pew (a legendary industrialist, then 85 years old) made remarks which still ring true:

No nation can long be secure in this atomic age unless it be amply supplied with petroleum ... It is the considered opinion of our group that if the North American continent is to produce the oil to meet its requirements in the years ahead, oil from the Athabasca area must of necessity play an important role.

The Suncor plant was a landmark in oil sands development. It pioneered technology for bitumen extraction and upgrading, and it was the world's first large-scale commercial plant. In the early years it was not particularly profitable, but the plant was nonetheless able to cover operating expenses from the sale of its own production. And in 1979, when federal policy permitted the company to charge world price for its oil, the plant finally became a money-making asset to Suncor. The plant found solutions to the problems of extracting a commercial grade of oil from the sands - problems that had been the concern of financiers, chemists, petroleum engineers, metallurgists, mining engineers, geologists, physicists and many other scientists and pseudo-scientists for many decades.

=== Syncrude ===
In 1962 (the same year the Great Canadian Oil Sands proposal went up for approval) Cities Service Athabasca Inc. proposed a 16,000 cubic metre per day plant at the site of its Mildred Lake pilot project. Including a pipeline to Edmonton, the plant was to cost $56 million, with construction beginning in 1965 and completion in 1968. However, the Oil and Gas Conservation Board had concerns about competition between synthetic oil and conventional oil for limited markets. It therefore decided not to bring too many oil sands plants on stream at once, and rejected the Cities Service proposal in favor of the GCOS project.

Cities Service later reapplied for a much larger plant, and the proposal received approval in late 1969. The Syncrude plant which resulted went on production in 1978, exactly two centuries after Peter Pond's first sighting of the oil sands. But before the plant shipped its first barrel of oil, the project went through many trials.

The reason for the long gap between approval and completion was an alarming escalation of costs that beset all major North American projects in the 1970s. High inflation multiplied budgets for practically every aspect of the Syncrude project.

Reviewing project costs in late 1973, the Syncrude consortium found that costs had more than doubled, from $1 billion to $2.3 billion. In December 1974, Atlantic Richfield (whose American parent needed cash to develop its Prudhoe Bay interests) withdrew its 30 per cent participation in the project. A few days later, the three remaining partners informed the Alberta government that the maximum risk they were willing to take on the project was $1 billion. They would need to find another $1 billion of risk capital if the project were to go on. The alternative - shutting down the project - would have cost the four partners (Including Atlantic Richfield) an estimated $250 million.

By this time the world was in the thralls of an energy crisis. Beginning in 1973, the members of the Organization of Petroleum Exporting Countries had taken advantage of tight world oil supplies to rapidly and regularly increase prices. Policy-makers in the oil consuming countries therefore considered it a matter of national urgency to develop stable, secure energy supplies. Because the resource was so large and development was clearly possible, the oil sands looked like Canada's best bet. As a result, the prospect that the Syncrude project would collapse was a matter of both political and economic concern.

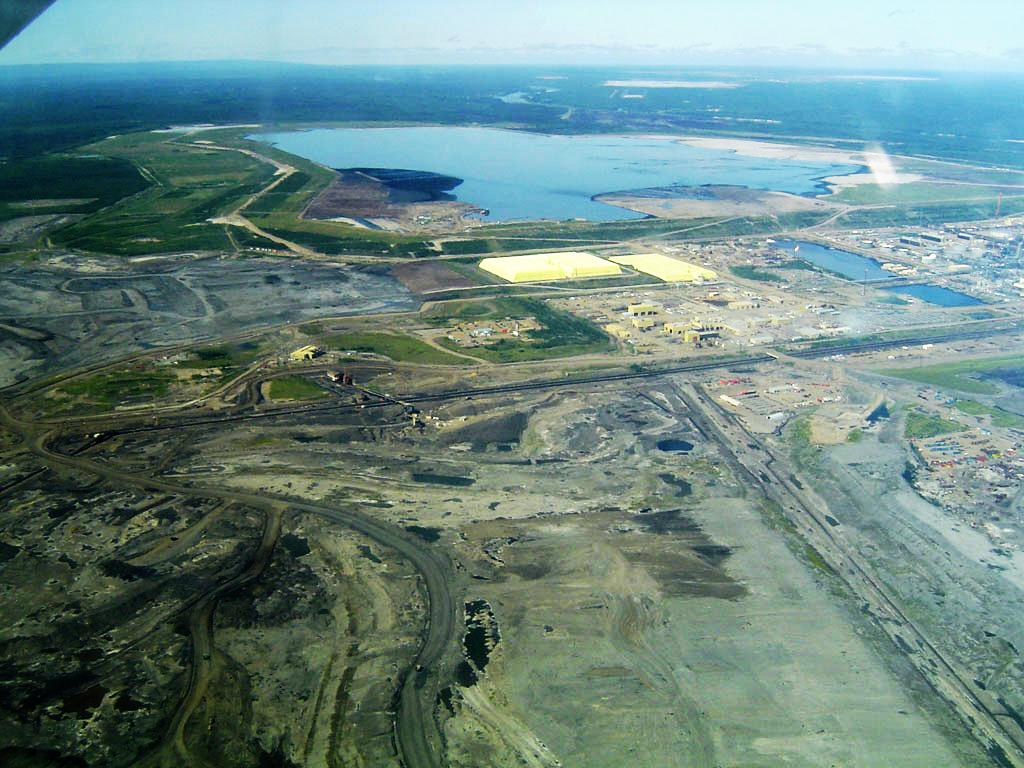
Minesite at Syncrude's Mildred Lake plant

An executive group representing the remaining partners invited the other governments of Canada to participate as commercial partners in the project. The province also reviewed the cost estimate given by the oil companies. When it found that the consortium's cost estimates were not out of line, the governments of Canada, Alberta and Ontario participated in a historic meeting in Winnipeg in February, 1975. That meeting salvaged the project.

The federal government took a 15 per cent interest, Alberta 10 per cent and Ontario five per cent. The private partners - Cities Service Canada, Gulf Oil Canada and Imperial Oil - agreed to retain their $1.4 billion interest in the project, but gave Alberta the option to convert a $200 million loan to Gulf and Cities Service into ownership interests. Alberta also took full ownership in the no-risk pipeline and electrical utility which the plant needed.

The plant went into operation in the summer of 1978 and produced 5 million barrels (790,000 m^{3}) of oil within a year. World oil prices leaped skyward in 1979-80 and remained high for the first half of the 1980s. This helped Syncrude become successful financially as well as technically. Syncrude now meets about 14 per cent of Canada's oil requirements, mostly in the form of synthetic oil. The plant has produced nearly 2 billion barrels (320,000,000 m^{3}) of this oil.

=== Shell in the oil sands ===
In 2003, Shell Canada and its partners began producing from the Muskeg River Mine, located 75 kilometres north of Fort McMurray. Known as the Athabasca Oil Sands Project, the entire complex consists of Muskeg River, Shell's Scotford Upgrader located near Fort Saskatchewan, Alberta, and supporting facilities.

Four years later, by which time Shell Canada had been wholly acquired by its parent, Royal Dutch Shell, the company applied to build a massive oil sands upgrading complex at the site of its Edmonton refinery. The project, which could cost as much as $27-billion, would be built in four 100,000-barrel-per-day (16,000 m^{3}/d) stages. Like its existing upgrader, Shell's new facility would process bitumen from the Athabasca Oil Sands Project, as well as bitumen from steam-driven in situ oil sands projects.

== In situ recovery ==
The oilsands projects just described are unique in the world: They exploit near-surface bitumen from open-pit mines. The industry has also spent decades experimenting with ways to recover bitumen from deeper deposits. The only way to develop petroleum resources underground is through in situ production techniques.

In situ means "in place," and refers to recovery techniques which apply heat or solvents to oil reservoirs beneath the earth. There are several varieties of in situ technique, but the ones that work best in the oil sands use heat.

The first in situ experiment in Alberta took place in 1910, when a Pittsburgh-based outfit, the Barber Asphalt Paving Company, drilled a bore hole into the bitumen and pumped in steam to liquefy the oil. The experiment failed. In the early 1920s, other in situ experiments also took place, but none were commercially successful.

Jacob Owen Absher: In the mid-1920s, a remarkable and persistent experimenter named Jacob Owen Absher incorporated the Bituminous Sand Extraction Company. In 1926, Absher received a Canadian patent for his in situ experiments, and he carried on numerous experiments over the following five years - efforts that drew the interest of oil sands pioneers Sidney Ells and Karl Clark. Absher not only used steam to melt the bitumen, but also tried igniting fires within his wells. In the end, however, he was unable to produce oil from the oil sands. His activities ended as the Great Depression raged.

While Absher has been largely forgotten as a pioneer in the oil sands business, others have realized his dream of using heat to release oil from the sands. Today, some commercial projects pipe high-pressure steam into the oil sands reservoir. Other projects actually ignite the oil underground, then pump air below the surface to keep combustion going. These techniques effectively melt the oil, which pumps then bring to the surface.

Thermonuclear thinking: The most dramatic proposal for in situ production from deep oil sand deposits came from Richfield Oil Company. In 1959 Richfield suggested an experimental plan to release liquid hydrocarbons from the sand through the expedient of an underground nuclear explosion. The company proposed detonating a 9-kiloton explosive device below the oil sands at a site 100 kilometres south of Fort McMurray. Thermonuclear heat would create a large cavern and simultaneously liquefy the oil. The cavern could serve as a collection point for the now-fluid oil, enabling the company to produce it.

This idea came remarkably close to reality. Project Oilsand received federal approval in Canada, and the United States Atomic Energy Commission agreed to provide the device. But before the experiment could take place, public pressure for an international ban on nuclear testing had mounted. The provincial government withheld approval and thus killed the plan.

In situ bitumen production: Many companies experimented with thermal techniques to produce heavy oil from the oilsands, especially in the Cold Lake oilsands deposit, in the 1970s and 1980s. Bearing such field-hand monikers as "steam flood", "fire flood" and "huff and puff" techniques, these extraction methods - like the Barber Asphalt and Paving Company's 1910 experiment - essentially apply heat to the underground reservoir. This melts the oil - that is, decreases its viscosity - so it can be pumped to the surface. An increasingly successful system now in use is steam assisted gravity drainage (SAGD).

SAGD was initially tested at the Underground Test Facility (UTF), ah experimental bitumen mining project funded by AOSTRA and officially opened on June 29, 1987. The magnitude of the UTF is hard to imagine. Sinking the shafts was done with a drill bit almost four metres in diameter, weighing 230 tonnes. The two shafts below the oil sand reservoirs were 223 metres deep and neither one deviated from the vertical by more than 25 mm. As a safety measure, AOSTRA constructed two parallel tunnels through the limestone under the oil sand reservoir. More than a kilometre in length, each tunnel was five metres wide by four metres high.

From the tunnels the researchers drilled wells up into the reservoir to conduct two sets of tests. The Phase A pilot involved three well pairs 70 metres in length, each with 40–50 metres of exposure to the McMurray formation. Phase B involved another three well pairs, 70 metres apart, each with 500 to 550 metres of direct contact with the oil sand reservoir. The results were excellent, and the petroleum industry soon began producing bitumen through SAGD well pairs drilled and operated from the surface.

The largest single plant in Canada to use in situ production is Imperial Oil's Cold Lake oil sand plant. This plant uses a technique called cyclic steam injection. Using this method, the company pumps high-pressure steam into a section of the underground reservoir for a week or so, then pumps the liquid oil out for as long as several months. Imperial also uses steam-assisted gravity drainage. In its SAGD production system, Imperial drills two horizontal wells, one five metres above the other. Steam injected through the upper well reduces the viscosity of the oil, which is recovered through the lower borehole. This plant produces more than 150,000 barrels (24,000 m^{3}) of bitumen per day.

The first Asian-owned company involved in the oil sands was JACOS, which in 1978 began participating in experiments at a pilot project in the Athabasca area. Like Imperial at Cold Lake, from 1984 to 1994 JACOS and its partners also experimented with a cyclic steam stimulation pilot project on the Hangingstone Lease. Since then the company has developed SAGD production on that lease. It is also constructing a demonstration plant using solvent-based in situ bitumen extraction.

== Heavy oil ==
Heavy crude oil is a sister resource to bitumen. It is lighter than bitumen and its reservoirs are much smaller than the great oil sands deposits. Like the oil sands, only a small percentage of Canada's large heavy oil resource is producible.

Often called conventional heavy oil, this low-density oil can be recovered by conventional drilling techniques or by waterflood, a technique of injecting water into the reservoir to increase pressure, thus forcing the oil toward the well bore. When these techniques work, heavy oil is like the more commercially attractive lighter grades of oil. But heavy oil can also be quite viscous. It can need some form of heat or solvent and pressure before it can flow into a well bore to be produced. When heavy oil requires these techniques to go into production, it is known as non-conventional heavy oil.

The first heavy oil discoveries came with the pursuit of conventional light and medium crude oil. Because much of western Canada's heavy oil is in pools close to the surface, early explorers using older rigs discovered many of those pools before they came upon the deeper light oil reservoirs.

One of the first finds was in the Ribstone area near Wainwright, Alberta in 1914. The province's first significant production of heavy oil came from the Wainwright field in 1926. Producers drew almost 6,000 barrels (950 m^{3}) of heavy oil from the field in that year. A small-scale local refinery distilled the heavy goo into usable products.

Elsewhere in Alberta, petroleum explorers made other heavy oil finds as they pursued the elusive successor to the Turner Valley oil field. They developed production from many of these fields, but only in small volumes. The recovery techniques of the day combined with the low price of oil and the nature and size of the finds meant that most of the oil remained undeveloped.

=== Husky ===
The most important exception was at Lloydminster. While the first discovery occurred in 1938, serious development did not begin until Husky Oil moved into the area after the second world war.

Husky Oil was born during the Depression through the efforts of Glenn Nielsen, an Alberta farmer driven to bankruptcy when the bank called a loan on his farm. Nielson had moved to Cody, Wyoming, by the time he founded Husky as a refining operation. He turned his attention back to Canada after the second world war, and decided to set up a refinery at Lloydminster. Steel was scarce, so Husky dismantled a small Wyoming refinery constructed during the war to provide bunker fuel to the American Navy. It loaded the pieces onto 40 gondola cars and shipped them north by railway.

The company began reassembling the 400 cubic metre per day facility in 1946, and the refinery went on production the following year. Strategically located between the Canadian Pacific and Canadian National railroad tracks in Lloydminster, the refinery soon began to get contracts for locomotive bunker fuel. The company also found a strong market for asphalt for road building.

Husky's move into the area spurred drilling and production. Within two years of Husky's arrival, there were oversupplies of heavy oil and shortages of storage space. Producers solved the problem by storing the oil in earthen pits holding up to 16,000 cubic metres each. For a while Husky bought the oil by weight rather than volume since it was clogged with earth, tumbleweed and jackrabbits. The company had to strain and remeasure the stuff before it could begin refining.

Husky began producing heavy oil from local fields in 1946, and by the 1960s was easily the biggest regional producer. In 1963 the company undertook another in a series of expansions to the refinery. To take advantage of expanding markets for Canadian oil, it also began a program to deliver heavy oil to national and export markets.

The key to the $35 million project was the construction of a reversible pipeline which could move the viscous heavy oil into the marketplace. The 116-kilometre "yo-yo" pipeline - the first in the world - brought condensate from the Interprovincial Pipe Line station at Hardisty, Alberta. The company began mixing this very light hydrocarbon with heavy oil, enabling it to flow more easily. The company then pumped the blend through its pipeline (hence the nickname "yo-yo") back to Hardisty. From there the Interprovincial took it eastward to market.

These developments made heavy oil for the first time more than a marginal resource. Within five years, area production had increased fivefold to nearly 2,000 cubic metres per day. By the early 1990s, production from the heavy oil belt was some 40,000 cubic metres per day, and Husky was still one of Canada's biggest heavy oil producers.

== Upgraders ==
Heavy crude feedstock needs pre‐processing before it is fit for conventional refineries. This is called 'upgrading,' the key components of which include 1) removal of water, sand, physical waste and lighter products; 2) catalytic purification (hydrodemetallization, hydrodesulfurization and hydrodenitrogenation; and 3) hydrogenation though carbon rejection or catalytic hydrocracking. Since carbon rejection is generally inefficient and wasteful, catalytic hydrocracking is preferred in most cases.

Catalytic purification and hydrocracking are together known as hydroprocessing. The big challenge in hydroprocessing is to deal with the impurities found in heavy crude, as they poison the catalysts over time. Many efforts have been made to deal with this to ensure high activity and long life of a catalyst. Catalyst materials and pore size distributions need to be optimized to deal with these challenges.

Figuratively speaking, technological improvements and new infrastructure cause heavy oil reservoirs to grow. Enhanced recovery techniques are urging a higher percentage of the reservoirs' oil to the surface. Research and development are creating technologies which have increased the amount producers can extract. Small improvements in technology applied to such a huge resource could mean enormous additions to Canada's recoverable crude oil reserves.

Few Canadian refineries can process more than small amounts of heavy oil, so production has traditionally gone to United States asphalt plants. This changed in the 1980s, however, with the announcement that construction would begin on two heavy oil upgraders. Like the plants at Syncrude, Suncor and Shell's Scotford facility near Edmonton, these refinery-like operations turn heavy oil and bitumen into lighter and lower-sulfur, more desirable crude.

In the late 1970s, a group of heavy oil producers (Gulf, Husky, Shell, PetroCanada and SaskOil) proposed the Plains Upgrader. This facility would have cost $1.2 billion and upgraded 50,000 barrels (7,900 m^{3}) of oil per day. Gradually, however, consortium members pulled out of the project as they concluded that the high cost of upgrading would make the project uneconomic. In the end, only PetroCanada and Saskoil - both Crown corporations - remained.

The private sector partners pulled out of the Plains Upgrader because upgrading heavy oil at that time was a risky financial proposition. To be economic, these projects rely on substantial differences in pricing ("differentials") between light and heavy crude oil. Heavy oil is worth less than light oil; the question is, How much less? Unless upgraded oil fetched considerably more per barrel than the less attractive heavy oil, the upgrader would not make money on processing the stuff.

While the Plains partnership collapsed, the idea survived.

=== Co-op Upgrader ===
Their partners gone, SaskOil suggested reducing upgrader costs by integrating with the Consumers' Cooperative Refinery in Regina, Saskatchewan. This would eliminate duplication in facilities and infrastructure by taking advantage of existing land, processing units, storage and pipeline facilities, technical and operating staff and management.

The Co-op refinery was a product of the Co-operative movement, which began in Britain in the mid-19th century. Frequently expanded and modernized, the Co-op plant (first constructed in 1935) was a small but modern oil refinery when talk about a refinery/upgrader complex began in the early 1980s. Both the federal and Saskatchewan governments had forbidden their Crown corporations to participate in the project, yet both took part themselves. The province had a particular interest, since an upgrader would increase the market for heavy oil from Saskatchewan's fields. This would give the provincial oil industry an important boost. The federal government saw the project as an opportunity to move the nation one small step towards the stated goal of crude oil self-sufficiency. For its part, the Co-op wanted an assured supply of crude oil for its refinery.

Accordingly, Saskatchewan took a 20 per cent equity position and guaranteed loans equal to 45 per cent of the project. In exchange, it became a 50 per cent partner in the combined operation with Consumers' Co-op, which committed its existing refinery (valued at $500 million) to the project. The federal government guaranteed loans equal to 35 per cent of the project. Repayment on the principal of the loans would not begin until late 1992.

On stream in 1988, the Consumers' Co-op refinery/upgrader complex, officially named the Co-op Refinery Complex in 2012, was a 50,000-barrel-per-day (7,900 m^{3}/d) facility. The $700 million upgrader provided upgraded oil as refinery feedstock.

=== Husky Upgrader ===
The company with the most extensive experience in the heavy oil belt was the one to propose - and eventually develop - Canada's other heavy oil upgrader. Husky began to prepare for the upgrader by building a new 25,000-barrel-per-day (4,000 m^{3}/d) refinery next to the old plant. This facility - which processed heavy oil into asphalt and simultaneously provided light oils for refining into high-end products like gasoline - was completed in 1983.

After a series of false starts, in 1988 Husky and its three partners announced a firm agreement to construct the Bi-Provincial Upgrader - today better known as the Husky Upgrader. Located just east of Lloydminster, this $1.6 billion upgrader received most of its funding from government. Originally budgeted at $1.2 billion, the federal, Alberta and Saskatchewan governments owned 31.67 per cent, 24.16 per cent and 17.5 per cent each. The balance belonged to Husky, which has since acquired the entire facility.

Under the terms of the original agreement, Husky would receive 50 per cent of the plant's net revenue plus a 10 per cent return on investment until Husky recovered that investment. The balance of plant profit would go proportionally to Husky's partners. A wrinkle in this arrangement occurred as the project neared completion, however, when Saskatchewan's newly installed NDP government refused to pay its share of $190 million in cost overruns. The other players eventually agreed to pay Saskatchewan's share, but would withhold returns to that province until they had recovered Saskatchewan's arrears.

The upgrader went on stream in mid-1992, but required debottlenecking before it could reach design capacity of 46,000 barrels per day (7,300 m^{3}/d). The plant upgrades Lloydminster-area heavy oil and Cold Lake bitumen, making still more of those resources available for central Canadian and American markets.

Heavy oil differentials explain the large cost discrepancies between the Husky Upgrader ($1.6 billion for 46,000 barrels per day (7,300 m^{3}/d) capacity) and the Co-op upgrader ($600 million for 50,000 barrels per day (7,900 m^{3}/d).) The Husky facility was designed to process heavier grades of oil than the Co-op upgrader, and its output was more desirable. This critical difference meant Husky would pay less for its feedstock and receive more for its output than the Co-op plant. From the beginning, forecasts about these differentials were vital factors in economic calculations for the two projects, each of which has since undergone major expansions.

== Metric conversions ==
One cubic metre of oil = 6.29 barrels. One cubic metre of natural gas = 35.49 cubic feet. One kilopascal = 1% of atmospheric pressure (near sea level).

Canada's oil measure, the cubic metre, is unique in the world. It is metric in the sense that it uses metres, but it is based on volume so that Canadian units can be easily converted into barrels. In the rest of the metric world, the standard for measuring oil is the tonne. The advantage of the latter measure is that it reflects oil quality. In general, lower grade oils are heavier.

== See also ==
- Energy policy of Canada
- List of articles about Canadian tar sands
