= Timeline of the petroleum industry in Alberta =

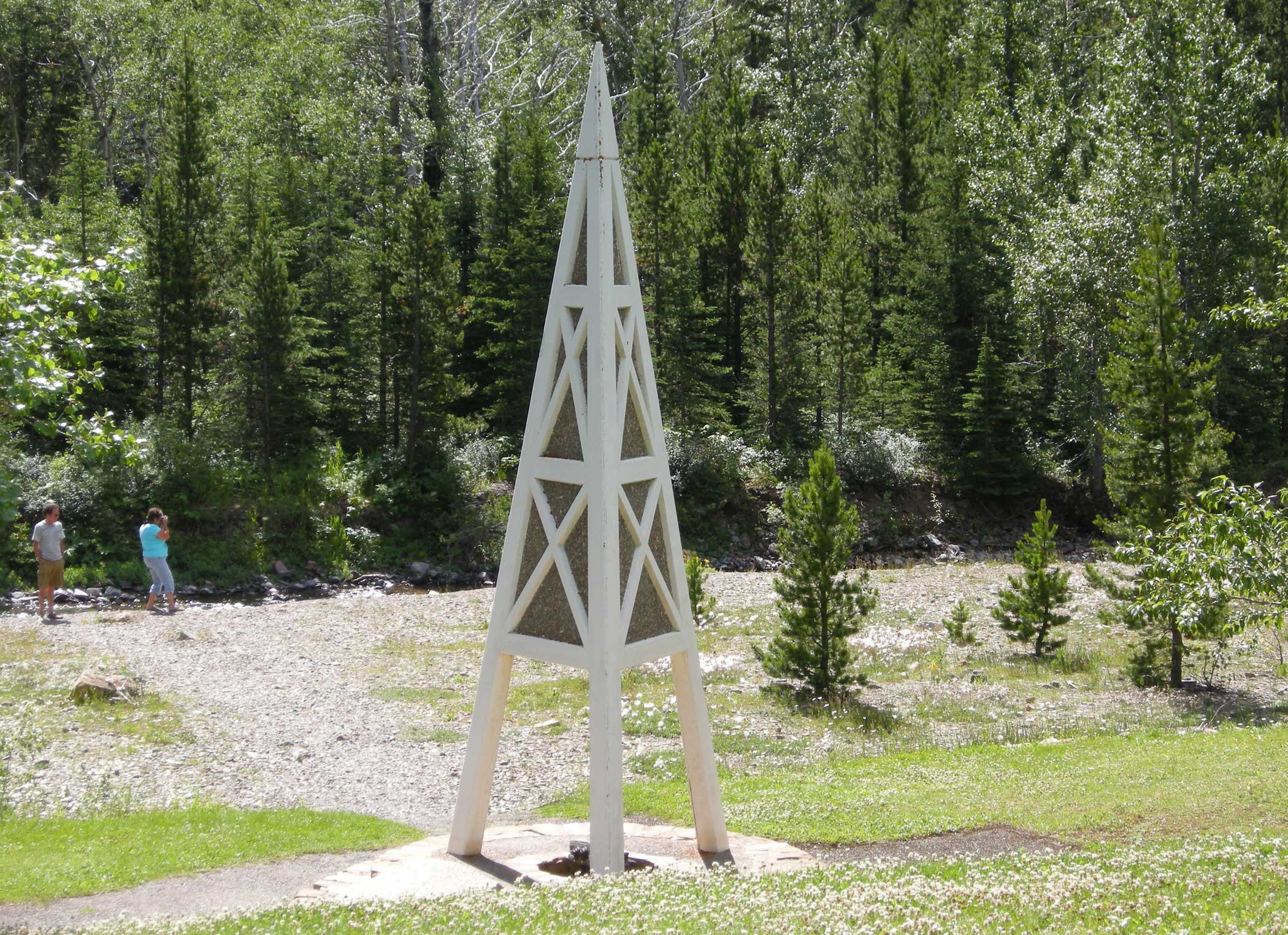
Site commemorating the drilling of Lineham Discovery Well No. 1

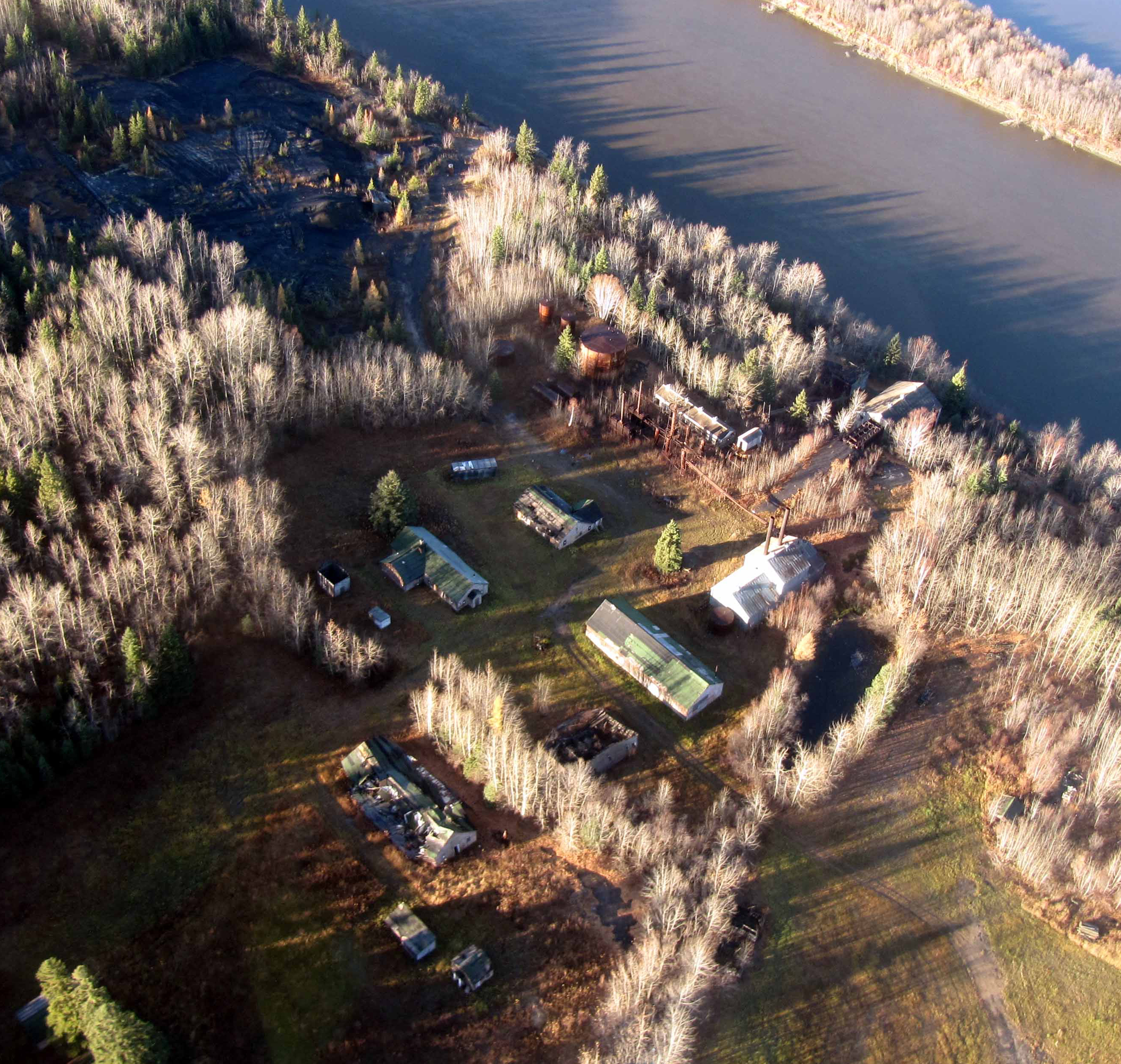
Bitumount in 2017.

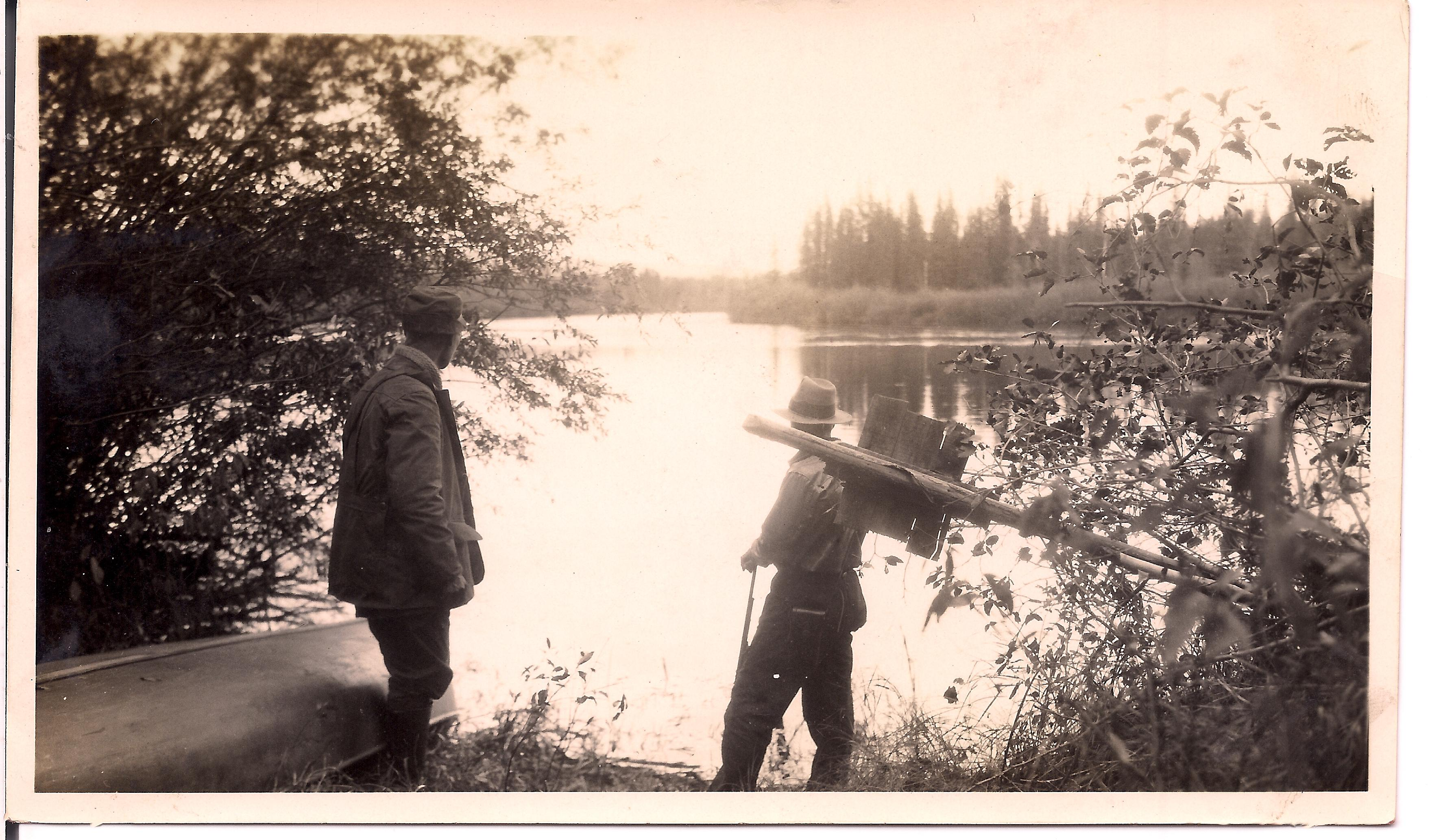
Dr. Karl Clark and guide Romeo Eymundson on the back of the Athabasca River during one of Clark's oil expeditions.

Map of all pipelines regulated by the Canadian Energy Regulator that originate from Alberta.

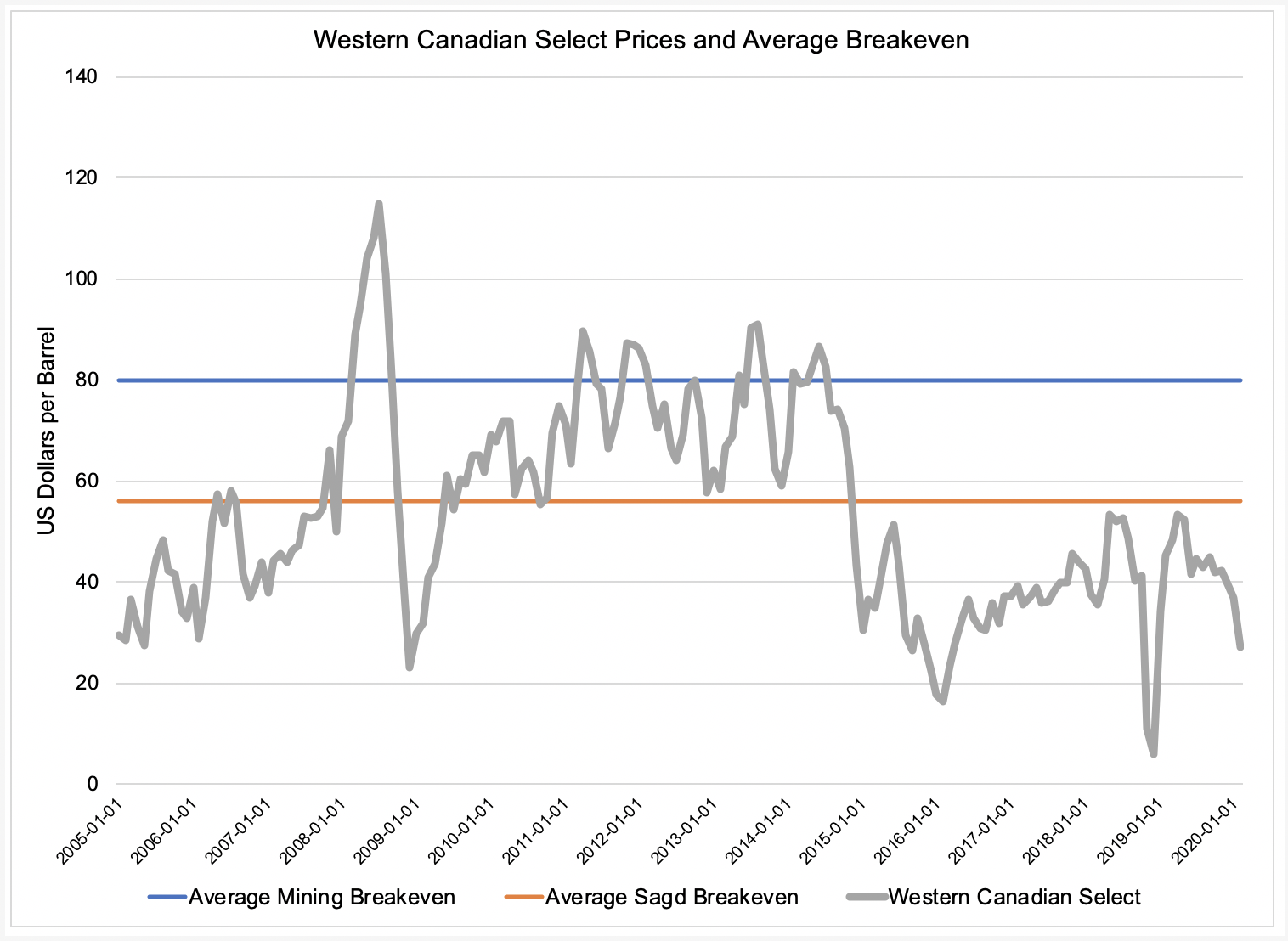
Graph outlining oil prices and breakevens for different extraction. methods used in Alberta.

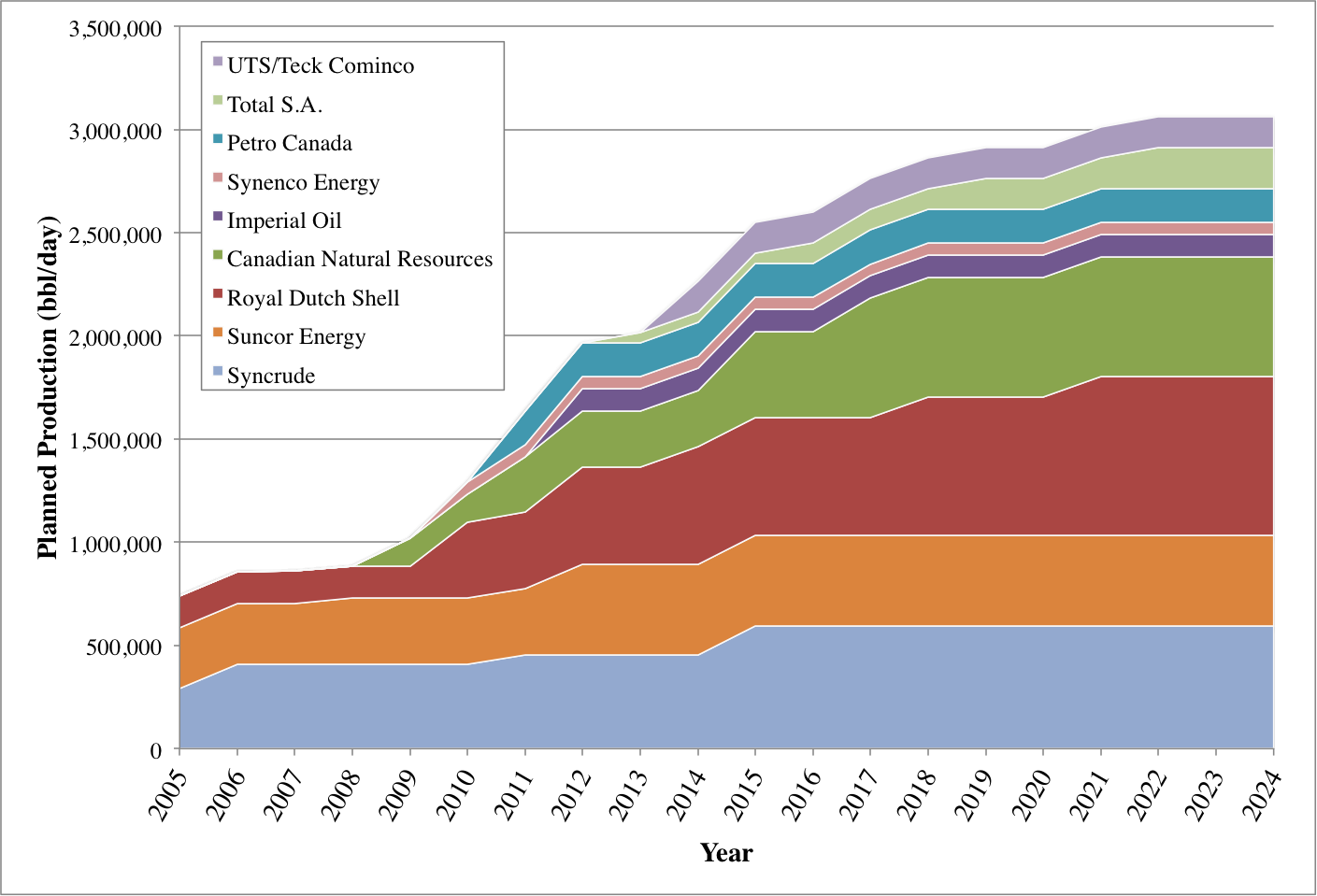
Planned production in the Athabasca oil sands.

This is a brief timeline covering the history of the petroleum industry Alberta and its predecessor states.

== Timeline ==
| Date | Event | Reference |
|---|---|---|
| 1715 | Captain Swan reports finding "gum or pitch" in the region now known as the Athabasca oil sand. The Captain's report is the first known to mention the oil sands. | |
| April 14, 1872 | Dominion Lands Act receives royal assent, granting mineral rights to settlers under certain conditions. | |
| 1874 | George Mercer Dawson files the first government report of the oil sands when surveying for the International Boundary Commission. | |
| 1902 | The Rocky Mountain Development Company drills the first oil producing well, Lineham Discovery Well No. 1, in Western Canada at Cameron Creek. | |
| September 1, 1905 | The Alberta Act creates Alberta as a province from the North-West Territories. Resource rights are still held by the federal government. | |
| 1914 | Dingman No. 1 strikes oil starting an oil boom that subsides due to World War I. | |
| April 17, 1915 | Public Utilities Board is created by the Alberta government as the provinces first organization partially responsible for energy resources. The organization later spawns the Petroleum and Natural Gas Conservation Board, then the Energy Utilities Board, and is then split into Energy Resources Conservation Board and Alberta Energy Regulator. | |
| 1925 | Construction on Bitumount, an experimental site dedicated to separating bitumen from the Athabasca oil sands, begins. | |
| December 14, 1929 | Alberta Natural Resources Act passed, transferring control of natural resources and Crown land to Alberta. | |
| 1931 | Alberta government levies its first royalty, at five percent, on oil and gas production. | |
| 1939 | Shell opens exploration offices in Alberta. | |
| February 13, 1947 | Leduc No. 1 strikes oil starting Alberta's post-World War II oil boom. | |
| 1947 | ATCO is incorporated. | |
| June 1948 | Calgary Petroleum Club founded. | |
| April 30, 1949 | Enbridge incorporated by Imperial Oil as the Interprovincial Pipe Line Company. | |
| 1950 | Interprovincial Pipeline (currently Enbridge Line 1) constructed as the first large pipeline to carry Alberta oil. | |
| 1951 | Alberta government announces the plant at Bitumount was able to separate bitumen from the oil sands profitably, following the research of Karl Clark. | |
| March 21, 1951 | Trans-Canada Pipe Lines Limited incorporated by Special Act of Parliament. In 2019, the company changed its name to TC Energy. | |
| 1953 | Husky Energy incorporated in Canada after splitting off from American counterpart | |
| February 23, 1953 | Pembina No. 1 is drilled marking the first use of hydraulic fracturing in Alberta. | |
| October 17, 1953 | Trans Mountain Pipeline enters use as the first pipeline to carry Alberta oil to the Pacific. | |
| November 1959 | National Energy Board created to organize interprovincial energy infrastructure. | |
| 1965 | Rainbow Lake oil field discovered by Banff Oil Company. | |
| 1973 | 1973 Oil Crisis begins precipitated by Western involvement in the Yom Kippur War causes OPEC to embargo many Western countries, increasing the price and thus competitiveness of Alberta oil. | |
| October 22, 1979 | Nova Chemicals opens the first ethylene plant in Alberta to be used in plastic production. | |
| October 28, 1980 | National Energy Program is announced by the federal government, creating anger and resentment in the West and set to take effect on January 1, 1981. | |
| June 1, 1985 | Western Accord takes effect, ending the National Energy Program. | |
| April 1, 1994 | AltaGas begins operations in Calgary. | |
| 2001 | Cenovus Energy pilots the first use of the SAGD system, technology developed by the Alberta Crown corp, the Alberta Oil Sands Technology and Research Authority at its Foster Creek location. | |
| September 29, 2004 | Imperial Oil announces headquarters move from Toronto to Calgary. | |
| May 29, 2018 | Trans Mountain Pipeline announced to be bought by federal government after the pipelines expansion faced ongoing regulatory delays for five years. | |
| June 21, 2019 | The Canadian Energy Regulator Act receives royal assent, creating the Canadian Energy Regulator to replace the National Energy Board. | |
| February 6, 2020 | Main article: Timeline of the 2020 Canadian pipeline and railway protests 2020 Canadian pipeline and railway protests begin as members of the Mohawks of the Bay of Quinte First Nation blockade a Canadian National Railway rail line just north of Tyendinaga Mohawk Territory. | |

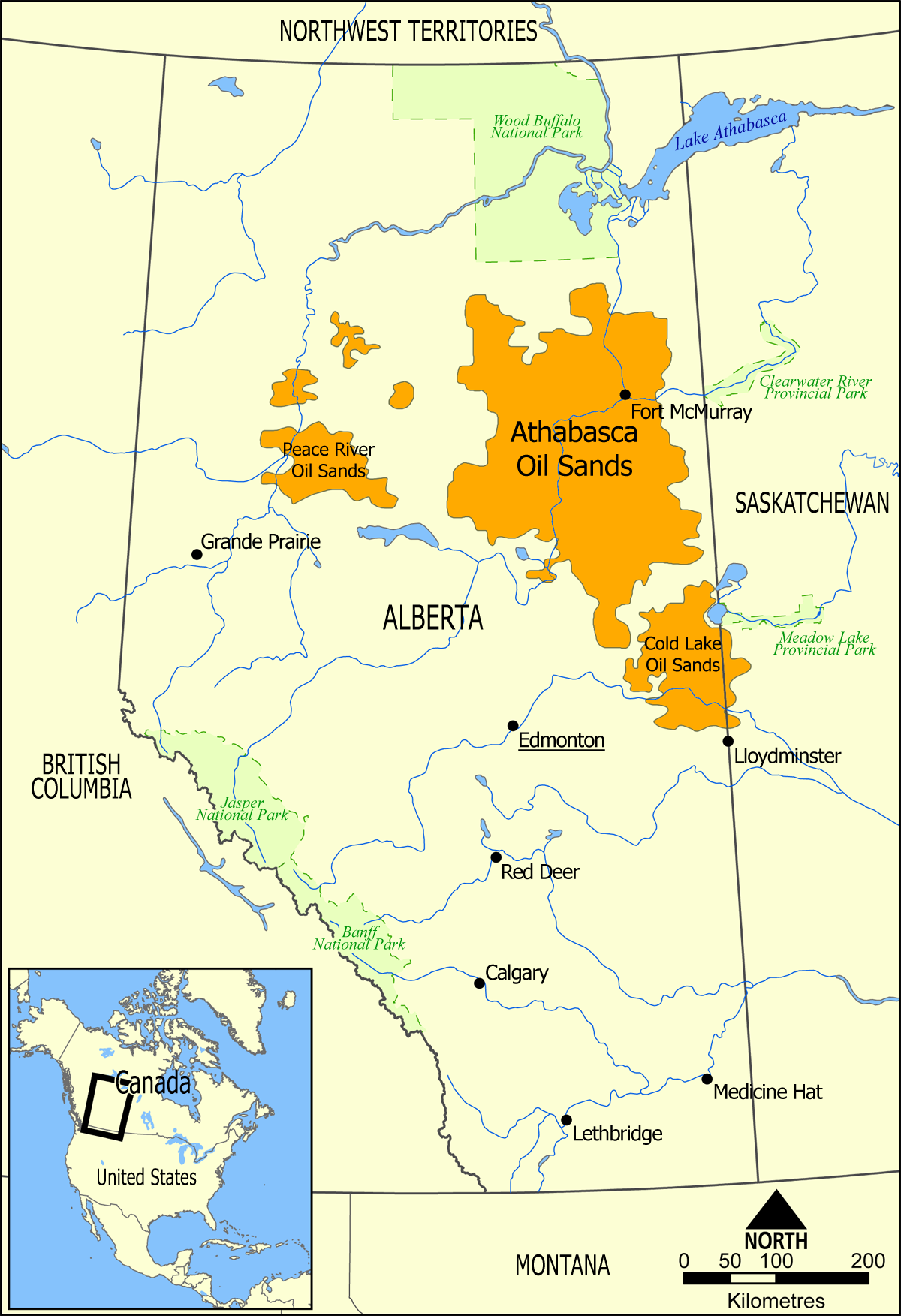
Map of oil sand deposits in Alberta.

Prominent oil discovery sites in Alberta.
