= Frank Sandercock =

Canadian ice hockey administrator (1887–1942)

- Born: August 16, 1887; Woodstock, Ontario, Canada
- Died: October 27, 1942 (aged 55); Drumheller, Alberta, Canada
- Occupation: Dentist
- Known for: Canadian Amateur Hockey Association and Alberta Amateur Hockey Association president

Frank Ernest Sandercock (August 16, 1887 – October 27, 1942) was a Canadian ice hockey administrator. He served as president of both the Canadian Amateur Hockey Association and the Alberta Amateur Hockey Association, and had previously been an executive with the Ontario Hockey Association and founded a hockey organization to operate leagues in Calgary. He was an early proponent of junior ice hockey and senior ice hockey in Alberta, fostered growth in the game, and sought to reinvest profits into minor ice hockey for the younger generation.

Sandercock had the Allan Cup championship format for senior hockey in Canada changed from a two-game series decided on total goals into a best-of-three games series which led to increased profits. The CAHA had become the largest amateur sport body in Canada by 1928, and control of the Allan Cup was transferred from its trustees to the association. He is the namesake of two trophies awarded for junior hockey competition in Alberta, and was made a life member of the Alberta Amateur Hockey Association.

== Early life and family ==
Frank Ernest Sandercock was born on August 16, 1887, in Woodstock, Ontario, to parents Francis Sandercock and Mary Ethel Powell. He had two brothers and two sisters. His father was a plasterer, and died while Sandercock was a teenager.

Sandercock excelled at sprinting and track and field sports as a youth, and later served as an executive with the Ontario Hockey Association. After he moved to Calgary in 1913, he founded a hockey organization for the city which had no local leagues of its own at the time. He was later joined in Calgary by his brother Willard Sandercock who worked as a lawyer. Sandercock was married to Nettie Evelyn Cosford on January 1, 1915, in Woodstock. Both he and his wife were registered as Methodists.

== Alberta hockey president ==
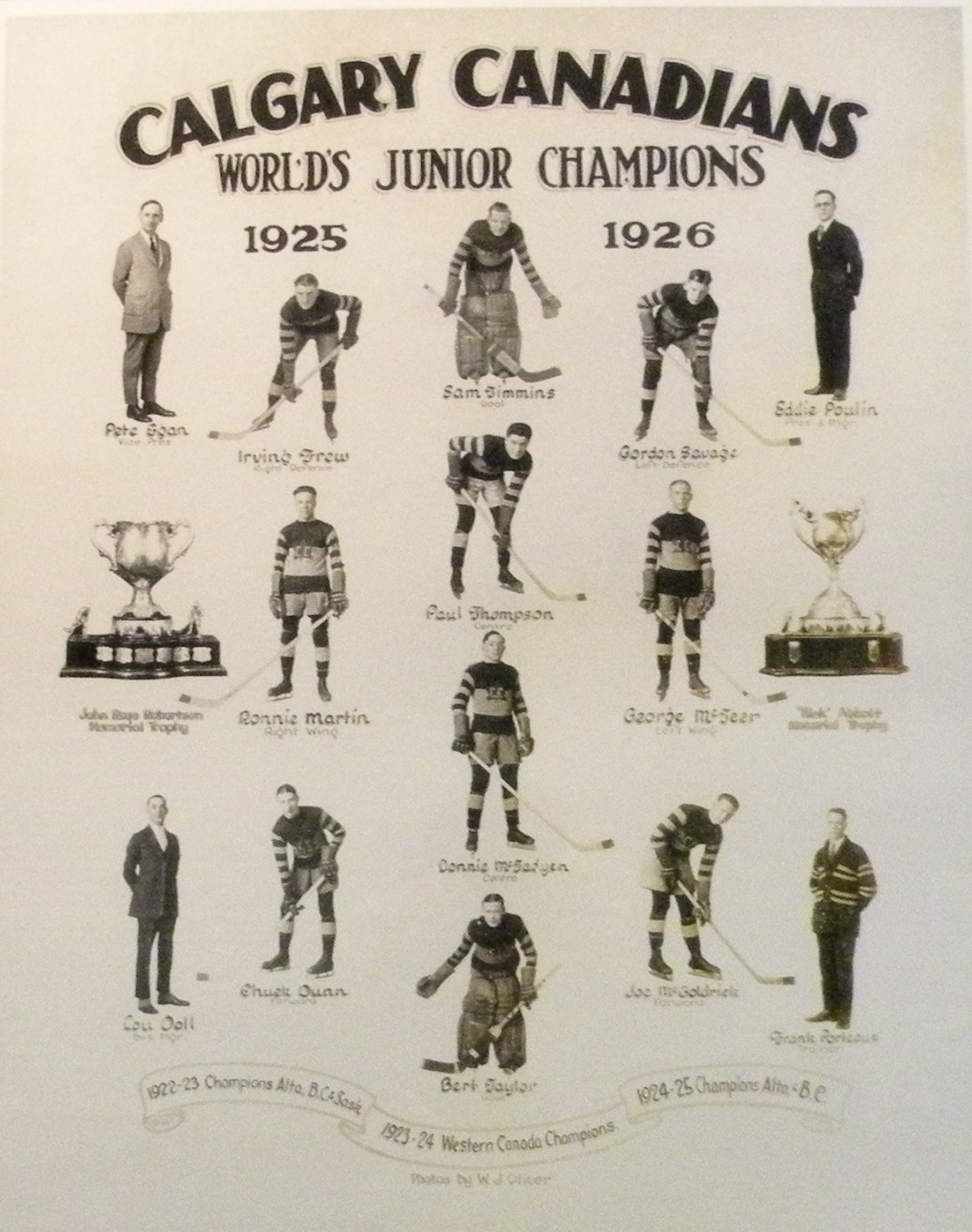
Calgary Canadians, 1926 Memorial Cup champions

Sandercock was elected president of the Alberta Amateur Hockey Association (AAHA) on November 12, 1922. The association chose not to enter into national playoffs for the Allan Cup, or intermediate level playoffs either since the province would not meet the residency requirements of the Canadian Amateur Hockey Association (CAHA) due to the recent coal mining strike in Alberta. The AAHA instead concentrated its energy into junior ice hockey and winning the Abbott Cup as champions of Western Canada. Sandercock attended the CAHA general meeting in 1923, and lobbied for financial assistance from the CAHA to prevent further losses incurred by Western Canada junior teams travelling for the Abbott Cup playoffs.

Sandercock was elected to a second term as president of the AAHA in November 1923. He implemented new player registration forms on behalf of the CAHA, which would allow the player to be on any team in the province and facilitate transfers to other provincial branches of the CAHA. Sandercock took charge of arrangements for junior and senior ice hockey playoffs in Western Canada.

Sandercock was a supporter of the Calgary Canadians, and took personal pride in the team's accomplishments. The Canadians won the Abbott Cup as Western Canada junior champions in 1924, and narrowly lost in their quest for a national championship at the 1924 Memorial Cup final.

Sandercock was elected to a third term as president of the AAHA in November 1924. He appointed a committee to implement a system of collecting a portion of gate receipts from teams to fund AAHA operations, as the association continued to see a growth in the number of players and teams. He applied to the CAHA to seek an extension to the residency deadline as it applied to mining towns in Alberta, since miners would not have moved to their work location until after November 15.

In November 1925, the AAHA passed a by-law to issue its own registration cards if it felt a player was declined by a spiteful administrator of the Alberta branch of the Amateur Athletic Union of Canada (AAU of C). Sandercock sought for the AAHA to require its members to get AAU of C registration cards to remain eligible for national amateur competitions. He also advocated for education for junior hockey players, and that any player neglecting his studies be removed from the team. He was succeeded as AAHA president by A. B. King, in November 1925.

== Canadian hockey vice-president ==
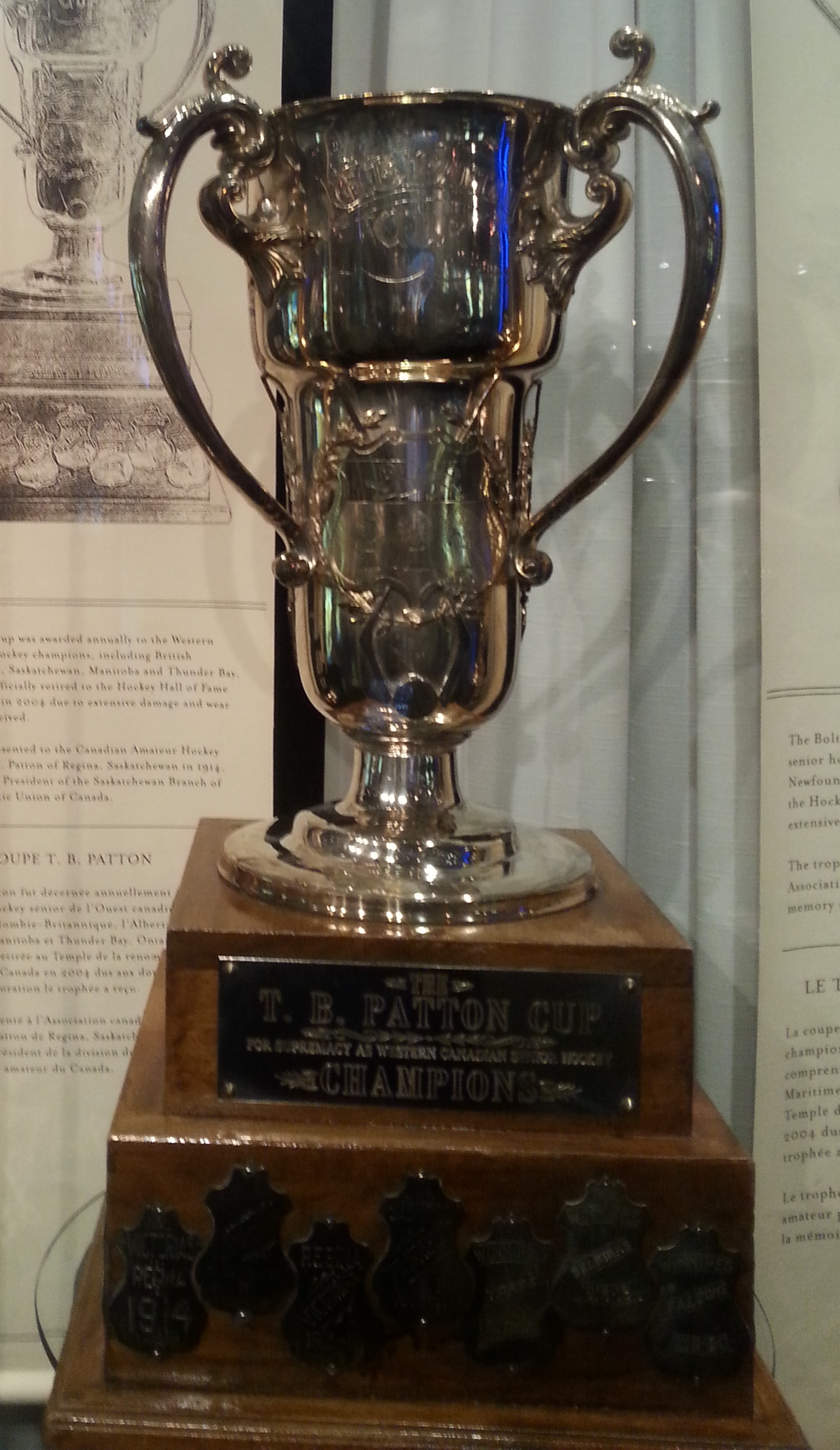
The T. B. Patton Cup

Sandercock was elected vice-president of the CAHA in March 1924, while still serving as AAHA president. The CAHA evaluated its practice of rotating hosting duties for the Allan Cup and the Memorial Cup series between Western and Eastern Canada, depending on where the final series of the Stanley Cup was held in any given year. The CAHA also discussed setting a deadline for provincial championships to be completed as part of national playoffs, and using Allan Cup profits to fund the Canada men's national ice hockey team.

In February 1925, Sandercock submitted a proposal to change the Allan Cup finals to a best-of-three games format instead of a two-game series decided on total goals scored. Public sentiment at the time was that in a two-game series, a lucky break was enough to decide the series, whereas a best-of-three format was less likely for that to happen. The change was approved by a special vote and put into effect for the 1925 Allan Cup, and Sandercock was put in charge of the playoffs for seniors and juniors in Western Canada.

Sandercock was re-elected vice-president of the CAHA in March 1925. At that year's general meeting, he spoke in favour of fostering better conditions for the younger generations involved in the game, and funding for minor ice hockey from the profits generated by the junior hockey playoffs. At the same meeting, the CAHA established the T. B. Patton Cup as the senior ice hockey championship of Western Canada, and severed its relationship with the United States Amateur Hockey Association due to persistent disagreements.

Sandercock was again placed in charge of the Western Canada playoffs for seniors and juniors. He ruled that teams sponsored by merchants were eligible for the senior ice hockey playoffs in Alberta, but would be required to change team names if they won the provincial title, to adhere to amateur rules and continue for the Allan Cup.

== Canadian hockey president ==
=== First term ===
Sandercock was elected president of the CAHA on March 26, 1926, to succeed Silver Quilty. The CAHA removed a ban on Canadian teams playing against amateur teams from the United States, and declared that any Canadian player would be required to sit out one full season after returning to Canada to become eligible for play in the CAHA.

The CAHA reopened discussions in November 1926, on whether Canadian teams could play against American amateur teams. The Ottawa District Hockey Association challenged that a vote via telegraph on the issue was not constitutional, and Sandercock appointed a committee to look into the voting practice.

The Allan Cup

At the same meeting, Allan Cup trustee William Northey stated the possibility of the Allan Cup being withdrawn from play unless amateur codes were strictly followed. Sandercock felt a new agreement was needed with the trustees since the CAHA was dependent on profits generated by the Allan Cup playoffs, and appointed a committee to discuss the usage of Allan Cup funds.

Later in November, The Canadian Press reported questions of eligibility of amateur senior ice hockey players who had tried out for the Calgary Tigers which played in the professional Prairie Hockey League. Sandercock maintained that such players would still be classified as amateurs by the CAHA as long as they had not played in a professional game.

CAHA branches disagreed about who had jurisdiction over teams in the playoffs, when a team had played the season based in a neighbouring province. Sandercock upheld a decision by the Manitoba Amateur Hockey Association that required the Winnipeg Hockey Club to compete in the Manitoba playoffs for the Allan Cup, instead of the Thunder Bay Amateur Hockey Association where the team played in a league. He also declared that after March 5, teams in the national playoffs were under CAHA jurisdiction with respect to scheduling and discipline issues.

In March 1927, the AAU of C recognized "that the CAHA was the largest and most influential amateur sport body in the Dominion" [of Canada]. The CAHA felt it had developed to a point where it could handle its own affairs, and adopted a motion to formally request control of the Allan Cup transfer from its trustees to the CAHA. Sandercock then named to a committee to oversee the transfer.

=== Second term ===
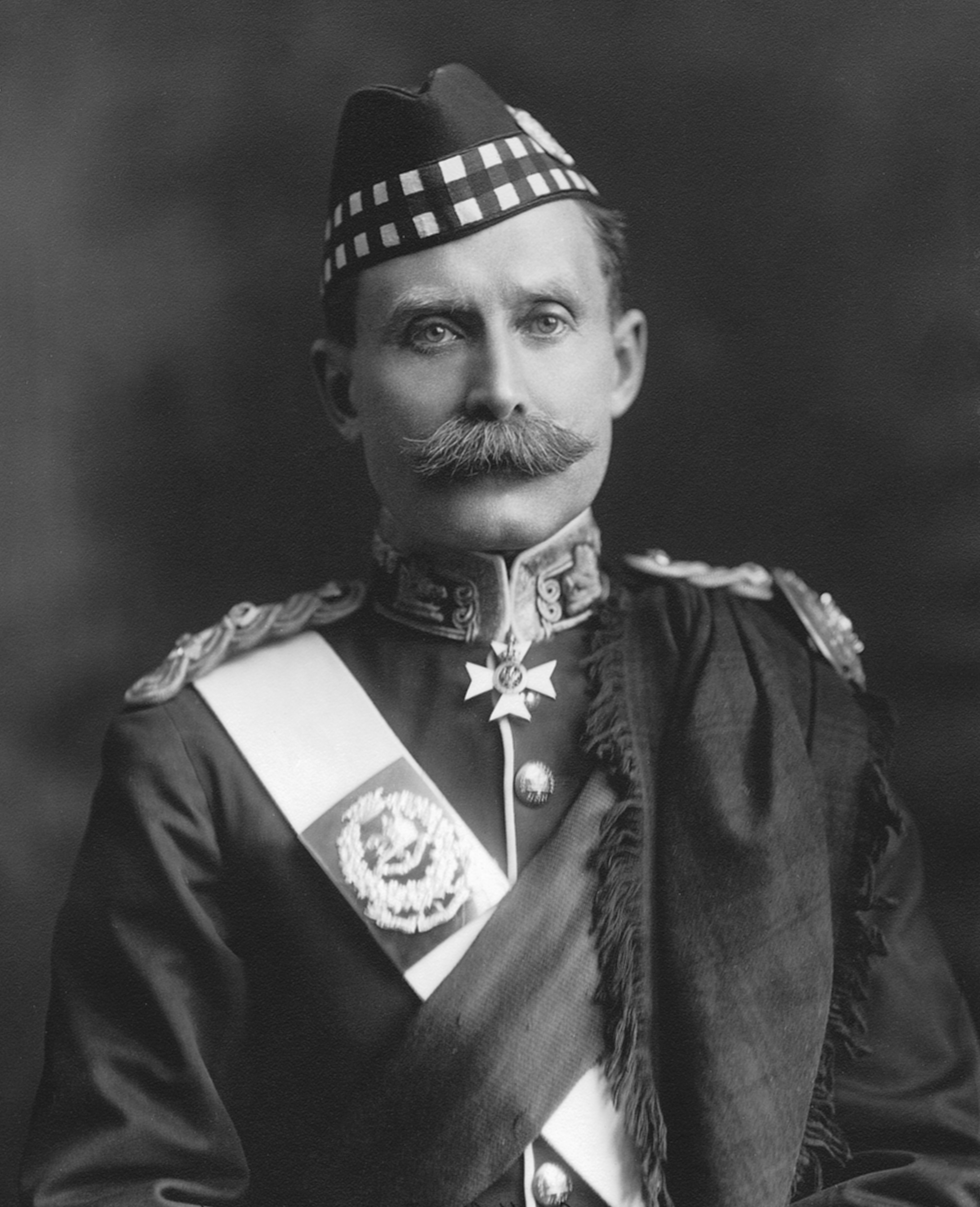
H. Montagu Allan was the donor of the Allan Cup.

Sandercock was re-elected president of the CAHA on March 28, 1927. He declared that the 1927–28 season saw the biggest growth to date in CAHA history, and the profit of C$16,000 from the 1927 Allan Cup exceeded the combined profits from 1923 to 1926. The CAHA decided on a deadline of January 1, for player transfer requests without a bona fide reason such as employment or a junior-aged player moving with his family. Sandercock upheld the existing residency deadline of May 15, despite a request by the AAHA to extend the deadline by six months.

The CAHA updated its constitution by request of the AAU of C, which automatically suspended any players with ties to professionalism until the case was investigated. Sandercock warned against hockey players participating in the new professional Alberta Southern Baseball League, since the AAU of C did not allow amateurs to compete against professionals in any sport. He felt that limiting athletes to just one sport would compromise the quality senior hockey, and supported a resolution by the AAHA which reinstated an athlete as an amateur if an affidavit stated the player did not receive money for playing baseball.

Sandercock sought for the autonomy of each sport within the AAU of C to govern its own affairs, and noted that the idea had reoccurred in Western Canada for several years. He felt that AAU of C constitution lacked public support and needed to be updated. He did not favour professionals and amateurs mixing within the same sport, but thought that professionals in one sport could be an amateur in another sport.

In February 1928, Sandercock stated that teams playing in an international amateur hockey league including a team from Portland, Oregon, would face suspension since the league was not sanctioned by the CAHA. He was also prepared to take disciplinary action against the British Columbia Amateur Hockey Association for approving the league. The league was subsequently disbanded and some international exhibition games were approved.

H. Montagu Allan wrote to Sandercock and agreed to donate the Allan Cup outright to the CAHA, after conferring with its trustees. Sandercock scheduled the 1928 Allan Cup final to be hosted in Ottawa, to coincide with the location of the upcoming annual general meeting. On March 26, 1928, control of the Allan Cup along with a surplus of $20,700, was formally transferred to the CAHA by William Northey in a ceremony at the Château Laurier. During the annual the meeting, the Maritime Amateur Hockey Association was added as a new branch of the CAHA, and W. A. Fry succeeded Sandercock as president.

== Business and community life ==
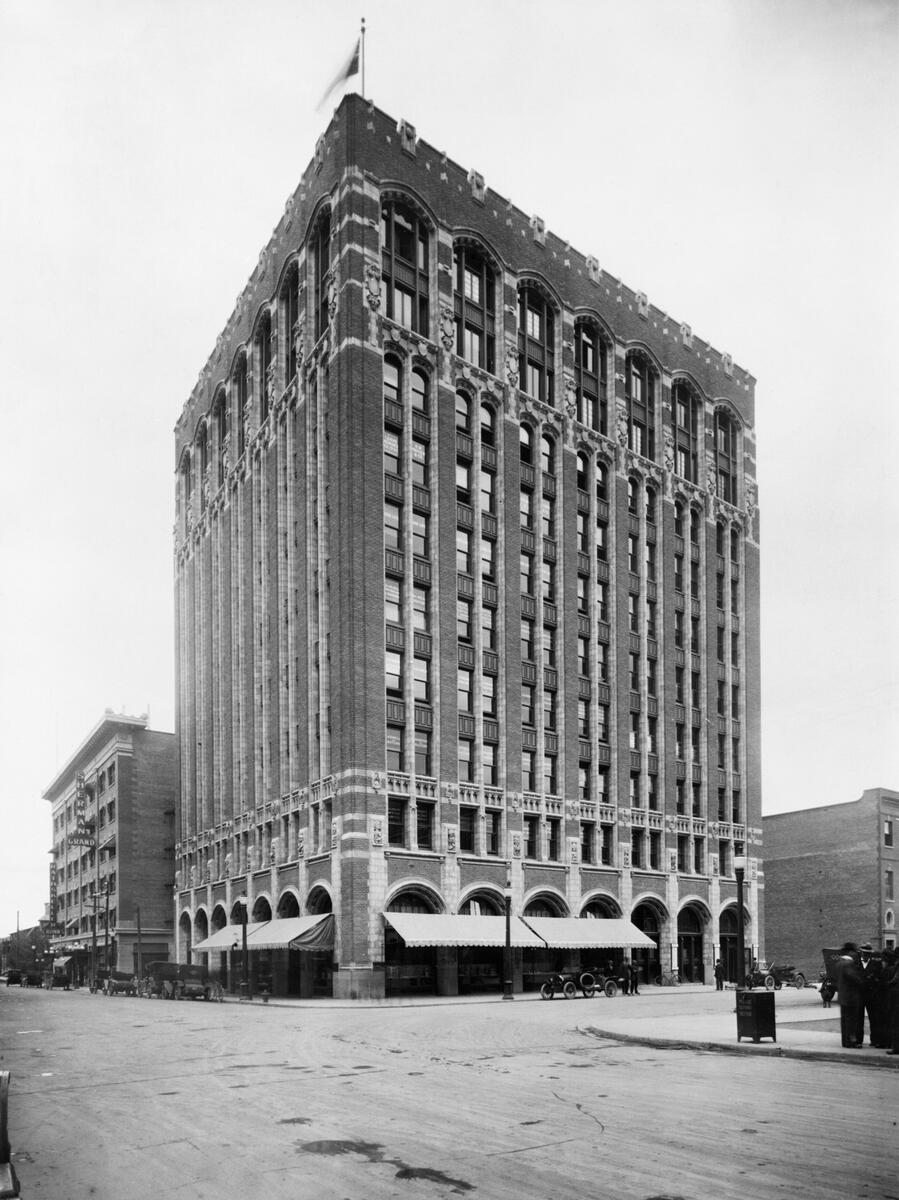
Southam Building in Calgary, c. 1914

Sandercock was a dentist at the Calgary Associate Clinic for 14 years, and later had his own office in the Southam Building. He had business interests in the development of the petroleum industry in Alberta, and was prominent member of the industry circa 1929.

He represented Calgary as a delegate to the Alberta Lacrosse Association meeting in 1932.

In October 1936, Sandercock acquired the dental practice of the recently deceased Dr. R. J. Johnston, and relocated to Drumheller, Alberta.

Sandercock became a supporter of junior ice hockey in Drumheller, and a member of the city's chamber of commerce to develop Drumheller as a tourist destination. He sat on Drumheller Board of Trade committees for membership, and museums and trail blazing.

Sandercock became involved with the Rotary Club of Drumheller and led multiple efforts as chairman of its community service committee. In November 1938, he aimed to raise funds to build a wading pool for the town, supply new gravel for the school grounds, and provide an oxygen machine for the hospital. He was also chairman of the Boys' Work for the Rotary Club of Drumheller.

Sandercock oversaw the theatrical production of Ten Nights in a Bar-Room and What I Saw There in 1939, and was appointed to the committee to recognize accomplishments of local professional hockey player Tommy Anderson.

In August 1939, Sandercock gave a speech at a Rotary luncheon about the history of the petroleum industry in Canada and the world. He spoke about the global impact of the petroleum industry on warfare, and sought for sanctions against supply to Germany and Italy in advance of World War II.

== Personal life and death ==
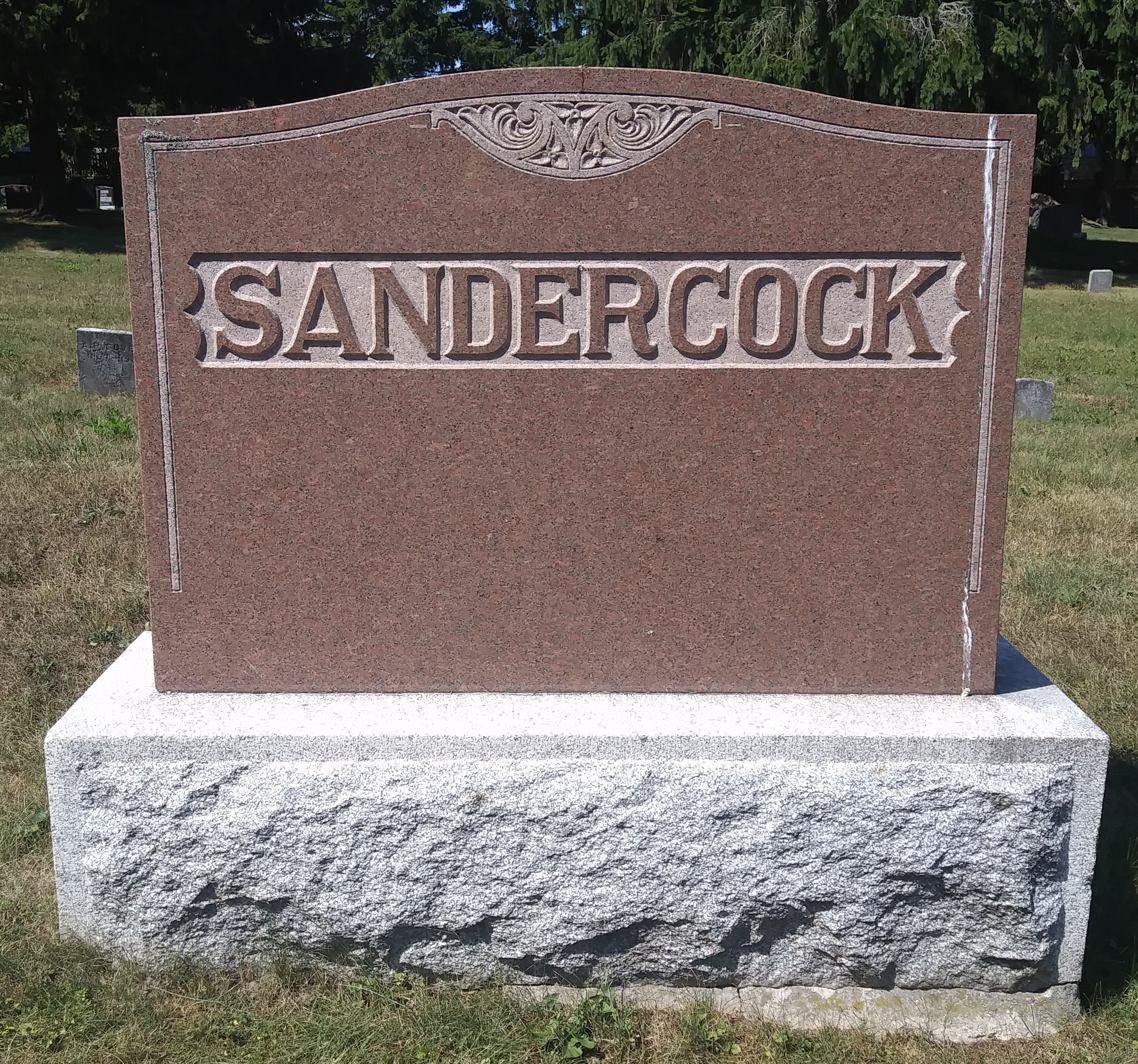
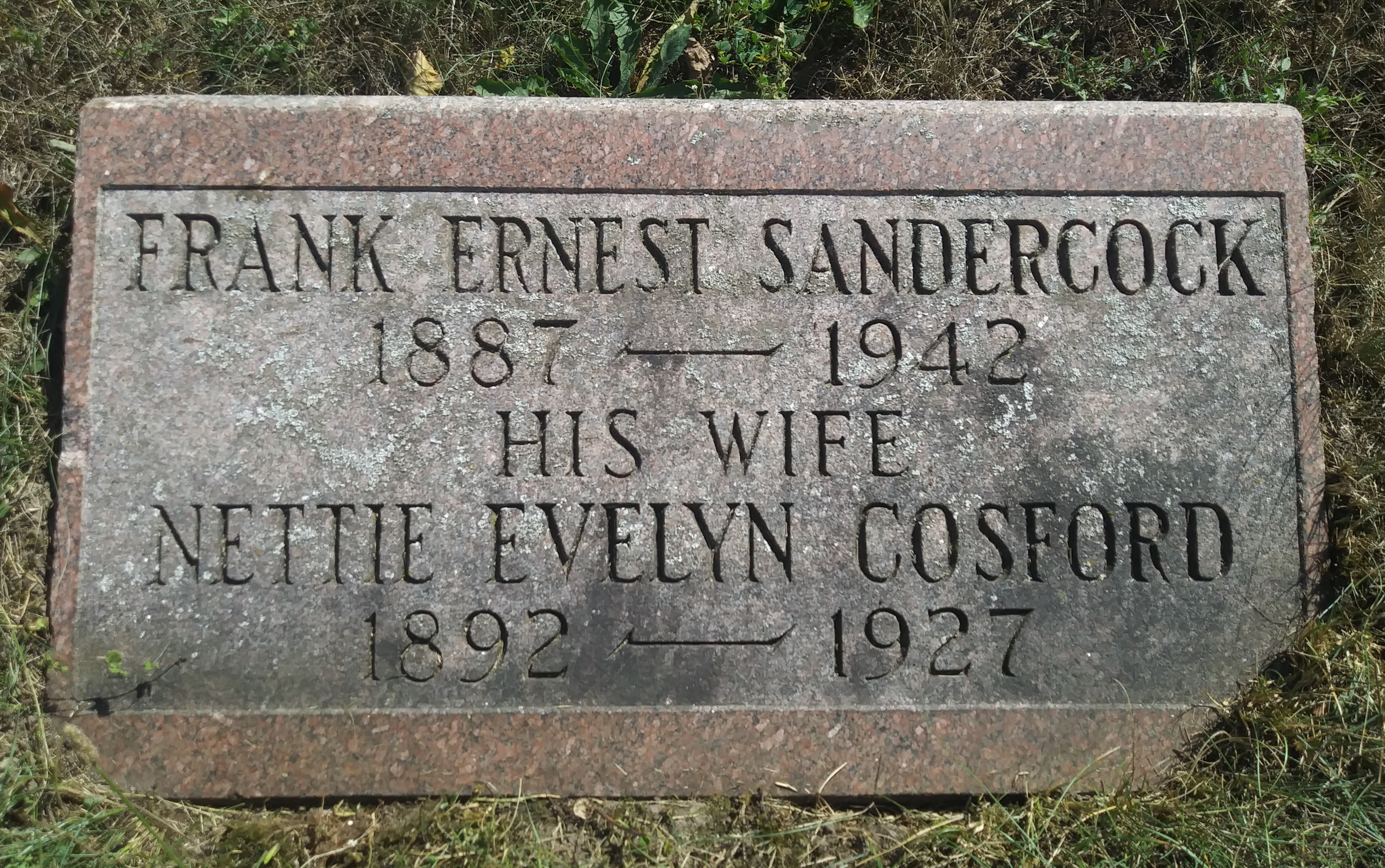
Sandercock's grave markers in Hillview Cemetery

Sandercock made frequent visits to his hometown of Woodstock. His wife died on February 10, 1927, at age 34 in Calgary, due to complications from surgery. They had three children together.

When Sandercock moved to Drumheller in 1936, he was reunited with his brother Willard, who was the town solicitor. Sandercock was a recreational lawn bowler, and was a Drumheller Lawn Bowling Club member. He pursued an interest in fossils as a hobby, and amassed a large collection from the badlands in the Red Deer River valley.

Sandercock was married to his second wife, Nancy Spence, in Calgary on April 7, 1939. They honeymooned at the Royal Alexandra Hotel in Winnipeg, while he also attended the silver jubilee celebrations for the CAHA. He was a guest where eleven of thirteen past presidents were in attendance at the event.

Sandercock died on October 27, 1942, in Drumheller, Alberta, following a brief illness. His funeral took place in Woodstock, attended by the local Rotary Club. He was interred with his first wife in Hillview Cemetery in Woodstock.

== Honours and legacy ==
The Calgary hockey organization which Sandercock founded had grown to include 232 teams within 15 years, and its graduates were playing in all of the professional leagues in Canada and the United States by 1928. While in Calgary, he donated the Sandercock Cup awarded to the champion of the Alberta versus British Columbia series, as part of the national Memorial Cup playoffs. He was made a life member of the AAHA in 1929, and was presented with a past president's medal by the CAHA in April 1933.

After moving to Drumheller, he donated the Sandercock Trophy awarded to the champion of the Red Deer Valley Junior Hockey League. He was also the namesake of the Drumheller Lawn Bowling Club's trophy for league play, which he competed for as a club member.

His collection of fossils was posthumously displayed at the Drumheller Museum.
