= Charles Eymundson =

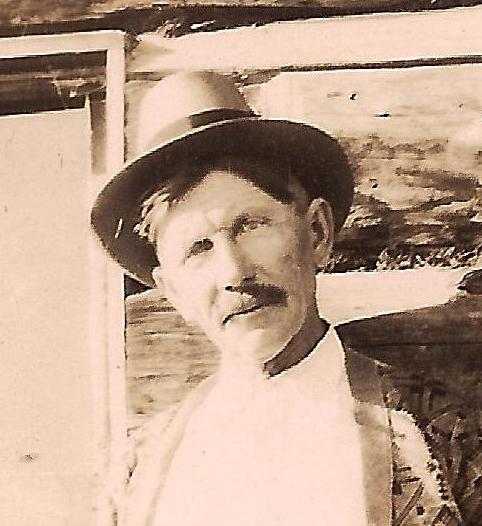
- Born: June 15, 1872; Sauðanes, Iceland
- Died: 1966 (aged 93–94); Camrose, Alberta
- Other name: Charles Matusalem Eymundson
- Occupations: lumberjack, detective, cook, hunter, trapper, wilderness guide, author
- Known for: photographer of Canada's north

Charles Eymundson (1872-1966) was best known as a photographer and writer, who recorded historic images of the early history of Canada's north, and wrote three books about his travels.

Eymundson was born in Iceland, in 1872. His father, formerly a sea captain, emigrated to the United States with his family in 1882. Eymundson's father died, in 1886, while Eymundson was still a teenager. His mother brought the family near Red Deer, Alberta.

Eymundson found work as a lumberjack, a private detective, and as a cook in China. He also became a skilled hunter, trapper, and wilderness guide.

His wife, Asdis Sophia Olafsson, was born in North Dakota to Icelandic parents. They married in 1910 and settled near Fort McMurray. In 1918 a catastrophic flood hit their property, and they were stranded on their roof for two days.

In the 1920s he served as a guide for Karl A. Clark, a geologist who played an early role in confirming the size and significance of the Alberta Tar Sands.

In 1924 he took over the small telephone company that provided service in Fort McMurray and nearby Waterways.

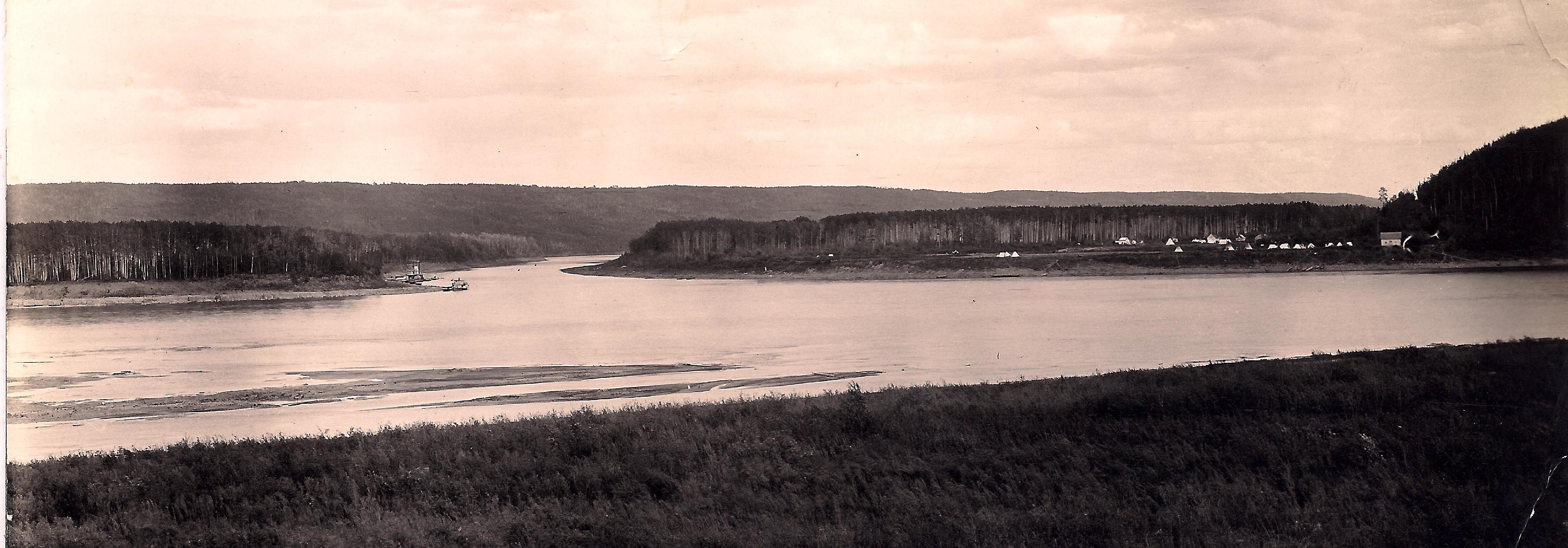
Eymundson's photo of Fort McMurray, in 1911.
