= JACOS =

Greenfire Resources Operating Company
- Company type: Corporation
- Industry: Oil and gas industry
- Founded: 1978; 48 years ago
- Headquarters: Calgary, Alberta, Canada
- Area served: Athabasca
- Key people: Robert Logan (President, CEO)
- Products: Heavy crude oil Bitumen
- Website: www.greenfireres.com

Japan Canada Oil Sands Limited (JACOS) was an oil sands extraction company. It was the operator of the Hangingstone oil sands project. JACOS was acquired by Greenfire Resources Operating Corporation in 2021.

== History ==
JACOS started oil sands activities in the Athabasca area in 1978 on leases held by Petro-Canada, Canadian Occidental (Nexen) and Imperial Oil to form the PCEJ group. It was the first Asian-owned oil company to exploit the Athabasca oil sands. JACOS and its partners experimented with a cyclic steam stimulation (CSS) pilot project on the Hangingstone Lease from 1984 to 1994.

In 1992, JACOS parent company JAPEX participated in the Alberta Oil Sands Technology and Research Authority (AOSTRA) steam-assisted gravity drainage (SAGD) pilot experiments at the underground test facility (UTF) site. With the positive results from the UTF project, JACOS decided to further pursue SAGD technology at the Hangingstone site. A 3-phase demonstration project was designed and constructed with the first phase becoming operational in 1999.

In 2021, JACOS was acquired by Greenfire Resources Operating Corporation (GROC) which is backed by McIntyre Partners and Griffon Partners.

== Operations ==
The GROC Hangingstone SAGD facilities are located on Lease OSL70, approximately 50 kilometres (31 mi) southwest of Fort McMurray and 25 kilometres (16 mi) west of the community of Anzac. GROC currently operates the Hangingstone Expansion Project as well as the Hangingstone Demonstration Project.

== See also ==
- Tar sands
- History of the petroleum industry in Canada (oil sands and heavy oil)
