= David Robertson Brown =

Canadian architect

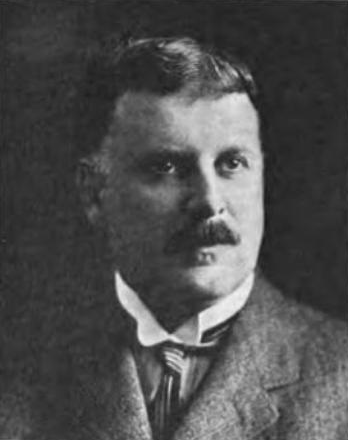
- Born: August 28, 1869; Montreal, Quebec
- Died: March 28, 1946 (aged 76); Montreal, Quebec
- Occupation: Architect
- Spouse: Harriet Fairbairn Robb (m. 1900)

David Robertson Brown (August 28, 1869 – March 28, 1946) was a Canadian architect.

== Early life and education ==
David Robertson Brown was born in Montreal on August 28, 1869, the son of James Brown and Elizabeth Robertson. He was educated at the High School of Montreal and then studied architecture for four years in Montreal under A. F. Dunlop.

== Career ==
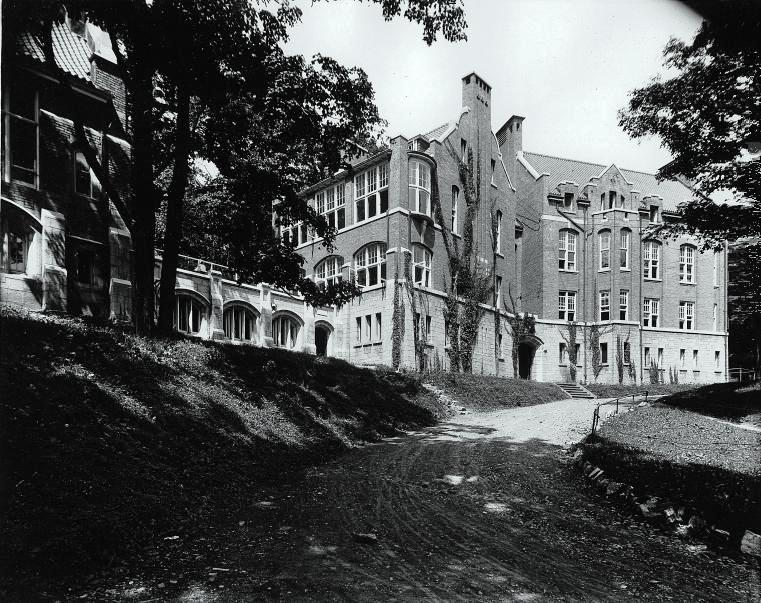
Children's Memorial Hospital on Cedar Avenue, Montreal, pictured in 1913

In 1890, Brown went to Boston, Massachusetts, where he worked for architectural firms, including Shepley, Rutan and Coolidge, heirs to the practice of Henry Hobson Richardson, before returning to Montreal in 1894 and forming the architectural firm of Brown, McVicar, and Heriot. From 1900 to 1905 he worked alone, then formed a temporary working partnership with Percy Erskine Nobbs, and finally in 1907 went into partnership with Hugh Vallance. Brown served as President of the Royal Architectural Institute of Canada and the Quebec Association of Architects.

Brown was a member of the Canada Club and the Royal St. Lawrence Yacht Club.

== Personal life ==
In 1900 Brown married Harriet Fairbairn Robb, a daughter of William Robb, City Treasurer of Montreal.

He died at his home in Montreal on March 28, 1946.

== Notable buildings ==
- Board of Trade Building, Montreal
- Medical Building of McGill University
- Montreal Children's Hospital (1904)
- Standard Shirt Building
- Southam Building, Calgary (1912–13, demolished)
- Memorial Gates, University of Saskatchewan (1927)
