= Great Canadian Oil Sands =

Canadian petroleum company (1953–1979)

Great Canadian Oil Sands Limited
- Industry: Heavy oil production
- Founded: 29 December 1953
- Defunct: 22 August 1979
- Fate: Merged with the Sun Oil Company
- Successor: Suncor

Great Canadian Oil Sands Limited was a Canadian heavy oil company that existed between 1953 and 1979. In 1962, GCOS received a permit from the Alberta government to build a 31,500 barrels-per-day synthetic crude plant in the Athabasca oil sands. The following year, Sun Oil acquired an 83 percent stake in the company and in 1964 construction of the plant began. When GCOS opened its plant on 30 September 1967, it became the first company in the world to produce heavy oil commercially. In 1979, Sun merged its Canadian subsidiary, the Sun Oil Company, with GCOS to form Suncor.

== History ==
=== Pre-history, 1920–1953 ===
Great Canadian Oil Sands originated in the early 1920s, when a group of policemen from New York acquired oil leases in Athabasca and formed the Alcan Oil Company. In 1923, the group sold the venture to Robert Cosmas Fitzsimmons (1881-1971). Fitzsimmons spent the next several years drilling on the leases he had acquired, but was unsuccessful. Inspired by the work of Dr Karl Adolf Clark (1888–1976) of the University of Alberta, Fitzsimmons turned his attention to surface extraction. In 1927 he reorganised Alcan as the International Bitumen Company, and in 1930 set up an extraction plant at a site he named Bitumount. During the summer of 1930, Fitzsimmons and his seven-man crew produced 300 barrels of oil. The oil was shipped by barge to Waterways, and from there by rail to Edmonton. Fitzsimmon's oil was sold in hardware stores and used primarily for waterproofing roofs. In 1932, Fitzsimmons a Canadian patent number 326747: "Process and Apparatus for Recovering Bitumen."

By 1932, Fitzsimmons had run out of finances to cover his expenses, and the plant ceased operation. In 1936 he attempted to revive the business and hired Harry F. Everard to design a new plant. The plant ran for a short time in 1937 before Everard left the company over payment disputes. Fitzgerald then hired Elmer Adkins, who ran the plant during 1938. By the end of that year, operations had once again ceased, and Fitzsimmons left the country to avoid his creditors.

In 1942, Fitzsimmons sold the operation to Montreal businessman Lloyd R. Champion (1904–1971), who renamed the company. During the next several years, Champion tried repeatedly to reopen the plant, but each attempt was unsuccessful. In 1948, the Government of Alberta took over the property. Oil Sands Limited. Starting in 1944, Champion negotiated with Sun Oil vice-president J. Edgar Pew for funding to build a plant, however, Sun elected to acquire a stake in a separate company called Abasand.

=== Building the company, 1953–1967 ===
In 1953, Oil Sands Limited was reorganised as Great Canadian Oil Sands Limited. In 1958 the company signed a contract with Sun to mine oil on land where the latter held a lease, which entitled Sun a 75 percent royalty on production from a proposed plant. GCOS submitted its application to construct the plant in 1960, and the application was approved in 1962. The following year, Sun purchased a majority stake in GCOS.

In 1967, GCOS complete the construction of its bitumen plan on Tar Island near Fort McMurray. The plant earned the nickname "Pew's folly" for being expensive and remaining unprofitable for decades.

== Leadership ==
=== President ===
Leslie E. Blackwell, 1955–1954
Donald J. Wilkins, 1954–1963
Clarence H. Thayer, 1963–1967
Kenneth F. Heddon, 1967–1977
Stanley A. Cowtan, 1977–1979

=== Chairman of the Board ===
W. Harold Rea, 1964–1977
Kenneth F. Heddon, 1977–1979
