= Southam Building =

Coordinates: 51.0521°N 114.0781°W

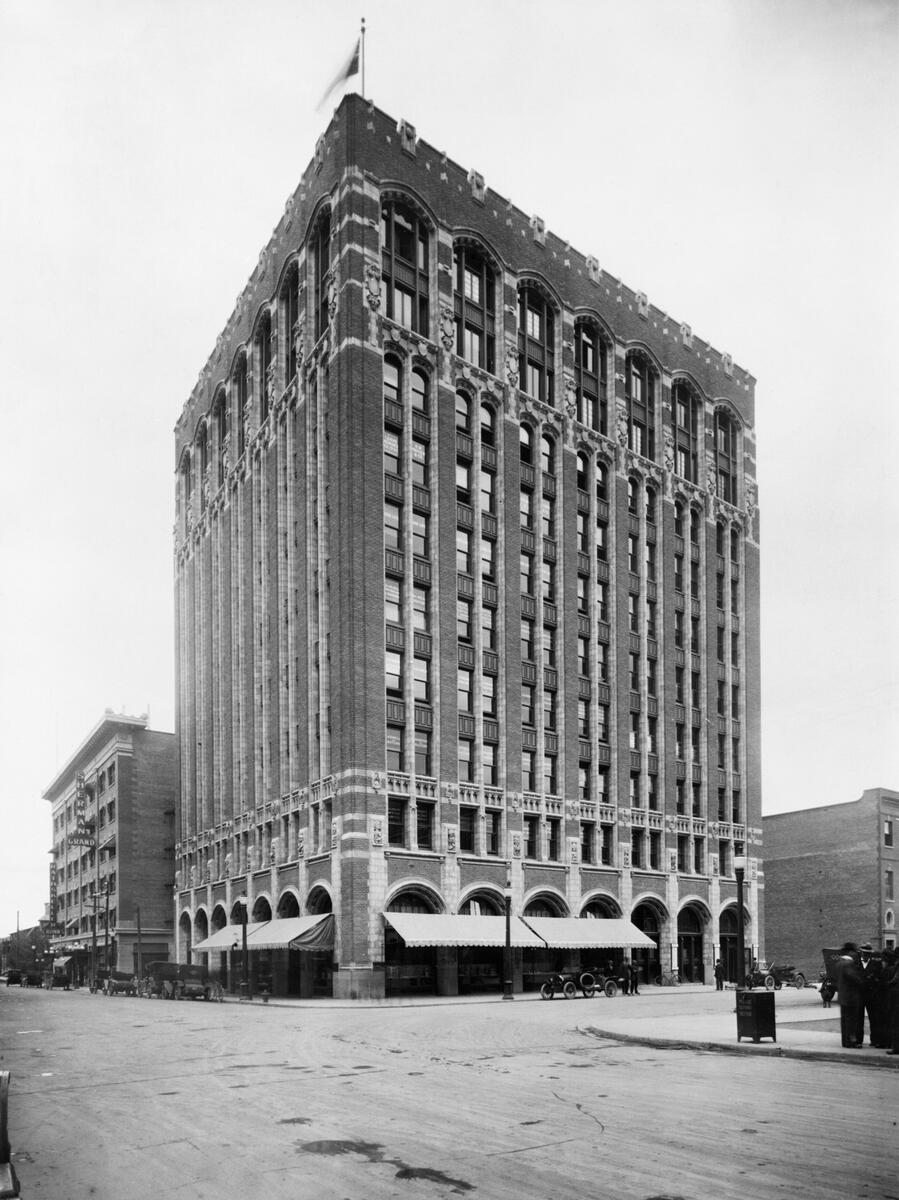
Southam Building in Calgary c. 1914

The Southam Building was a ten-storey office tower located at 130 7th Avenue Southwest in Calgary, Alberta, Canada. Designed by Montreal architectural firm Brown and Vallance and built between 1912 and 1913, the Southam Building was one of Calgary's best examples of Gothic Revival architecture. Between 1913 and 1932 the building housed the offices of the Calgary Daily Herald, during which time it was also known as the Herald Building. It later served as a Greyhound Bus terminal and was known as the Greyhound Building. The Southam Building was demolished in 1972.

The Southam Building was one of two buildings at the intersection of 1st Street South West and 7th Avenue South West built contemporaneously by the Southam Company, the other being the Southam Chambers.

== History and design ==
The site on which the Southam Building was located was originally home to the First Baptist Church. The original church was built in 1901 and was destroyed by fire in 1904. It was rebuilt soon after, this time in white brick. After the congregation outgrew the location, the property was sold to the Southam Company, who had bought the Calgary Daily Herald in 1908. The Montreal architectural firm Brown and Vallance was hired to design a new building for the site, which would serve as the offices for the newspaper. This firm also designed the Canada Life Assurance Building at 301 8th Avenue Southwest. Construction on the Southam commenced in June 1912; the building opened on 13 December 1913.

Built with terra cotta, tawny brick, and sandstone, the Southam was one of a select number of gothic revival buildings in Calgary. The British pottery makers Royal Doulton were commissioned to design eight gargoyles, each of which depicted a newspaper character. Lettered banners on each of the gargoyles labelled them as "The Architect," "The Ither Architect" (the other architect), "The Editor," "The Sub-Editor," "The Stenog" (stenographer), "Biss the Devil" (printer's devil?), and "Type-setter." The eighth large figure was of a bearded man pushing a broom, but had no label; perhaps the janitor? Many of the gargoyles were saved when the building was demolished and today can be been on the exterior walls of the Alberta Hotel and the interior of the Calgary Telus Convention Centre. The Southam building was demolished in 1972.

== Notable tenants ==
The primary original tenant was the Herald, but offices were also occupied by dentists, physicians, and on the top floor, the radio station CFAC. Dentist Frank Sandercock practiced in the building during the 1920s and early 1930s. After the Herald moved to the Southam Chambers in 1933, the building was bought by Greyhound Bus Lines, who occupied the building until it was demolished.
