= First Oil Well in Western Canada =

Defunct oil well and national historic site of Canada

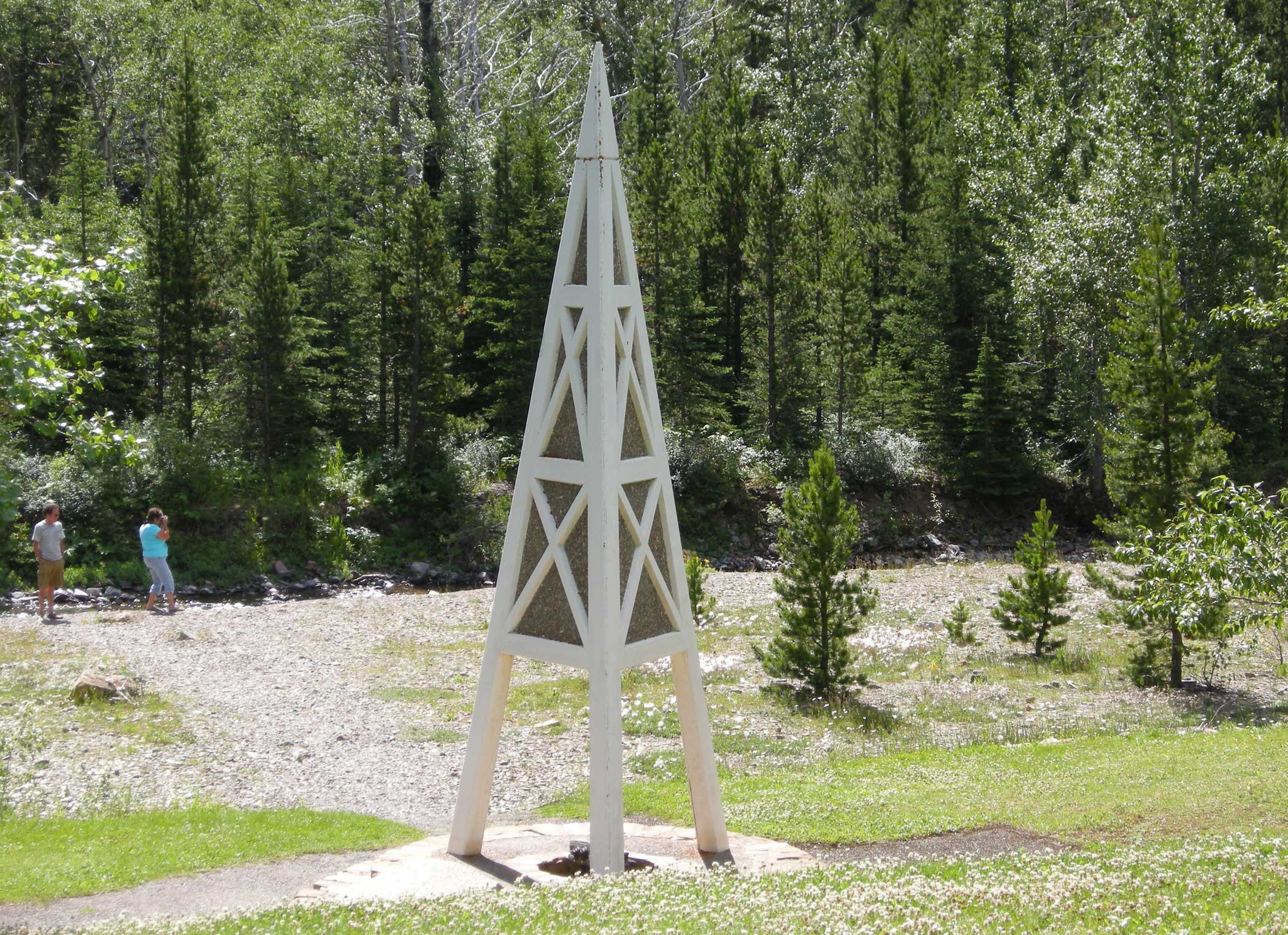
- Historical Marker at Location of Well

- Location within Alberta
- 49°04′15.48″N 113°59′12.29″W
- Location: Alberta, Canada

History
- Established: 1965
- Founder: Natural History Branch, Geological Survey of Canada
- Built: 1902

Site notes
- Governing body: Parks Canada
- Website: www.pc.gc.ca/en/lhn-nhs/ab/puits-well

National Historic Site of Canada
- Official name: First Oil Well in Western Canada National Historic Site
- Designated: 17 May 1965

The First Oil Well in Western Canada, also known as Lineham Discovery Well No. 1, is a defunct oil well and national historic site of Canada, which commemorates the September 21, 1902 oil strike in what is now Waterton Lakes National Park, Alberta. The well, originally drilled in 1902, was the first productive oil well in the western Canadian provinces.

== History ==
=== Initiators ===
The well was drilled by John Lineham, a Calgary businessman and former member of the Legislative Assembly for the North-West Territories, George K. Leeson and Kootenay Brown, whose Rocky Mountain Development Company purchased a mineral claim of 650 acres (2.6 km^{2}) on the land along Oil Creek (now Cameron Creek) for a dollar an acre, a region of natural oil seeps.

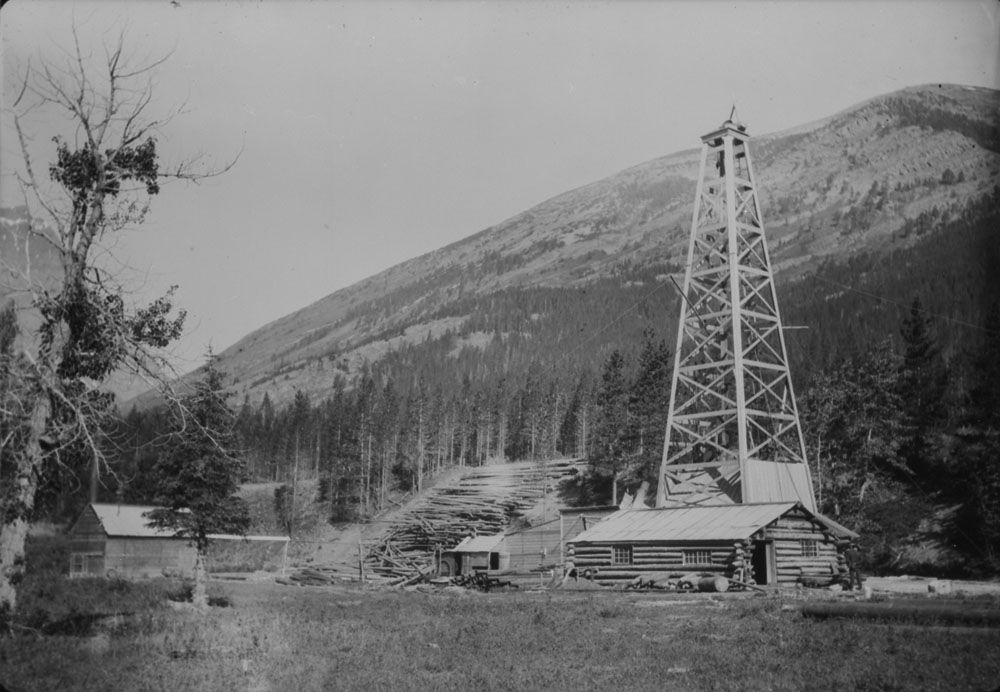
The Rocky Mountain Development Company's Lineham Discovery Well No. 1 in 1906.

==== Timeline ====
The area had been drilled unsuccessfully for oil in the early 1890s. Lineham's well was drilled by a wood "Canadian Pole" rig powered by a 35-horsepower (26 kW) steam engine. Drilling began in November 1901 and succeeded on 21 September 1902. The Lineham Discovery Well No. 1 struck oil at 311 metres (1,020 ft), producing saleable quantities of oil at the rate of 300 barrels per day (48 m^{3}/d). The well casing quickly failed, and the bore became jammed with debris and drilling tools. It was cleared in 1904 and a pump was later installed. Drill tools continued to jam the well and it was quickly abandoned. The tools remain visible in the bore. Total production was about 8,000 barrels (1,300 m^{3}) of oil.

== Well abandonment ==
Production had diminished before the well was blocked. Further explorations in the area yielded nothing useful with a majority of the nearby drilling sites abandoned by 1908, but general exploration in more northerly portions of Alberta, yielded the Turner Valley field in 1914. The Oil Creek strike is believed to be the result of oil seepage along fault planes in the Lewis Overthrust, in which oil originating in younger Cretaceous rock has moved upwards through older Pre-Cambrian rock that has been forced over the oil-bearing layers. More oil in the Waterton area was eventually discovered at the Pincher Creek oil field in 1948.

A small monument, depicting a stylized drill rig, was placed over the well in 1968. The site was designated a site of national significance in 1965.
