= Underground Test Facility =

Enhanced oil recovery research in Canada

The Underground Test Facility (UTF) site is located approximately 60 km (37 mi) northwest of Fort McMurray in Alberta, Canada.

In the 1980s, Alberta Oil Sands Technology and Research Authority (AOSTRA) initiated an extensive program to evaluate horizontal well recovery processes for Steam-assisted gravity drainage (SAGD) deep oil recovery from shafts and tunnels (Shaft and Tunnel Access Concept – SATAC. The SAGD process which developed in the late 1980s included drilling wells in pairs with the producer at the base of the reservoir and the steam injector from the above. The top well injects heat into the reservoir to form a steam chamber and makes the bitumen more liquid which then drains to the production well. The UTF site contains an oil reservoir 20 meters (66 ft) thick. It was determined that these reserves could be mined from tunnels in the limestone below the pay zone using SAGD.
