= Bitumount =

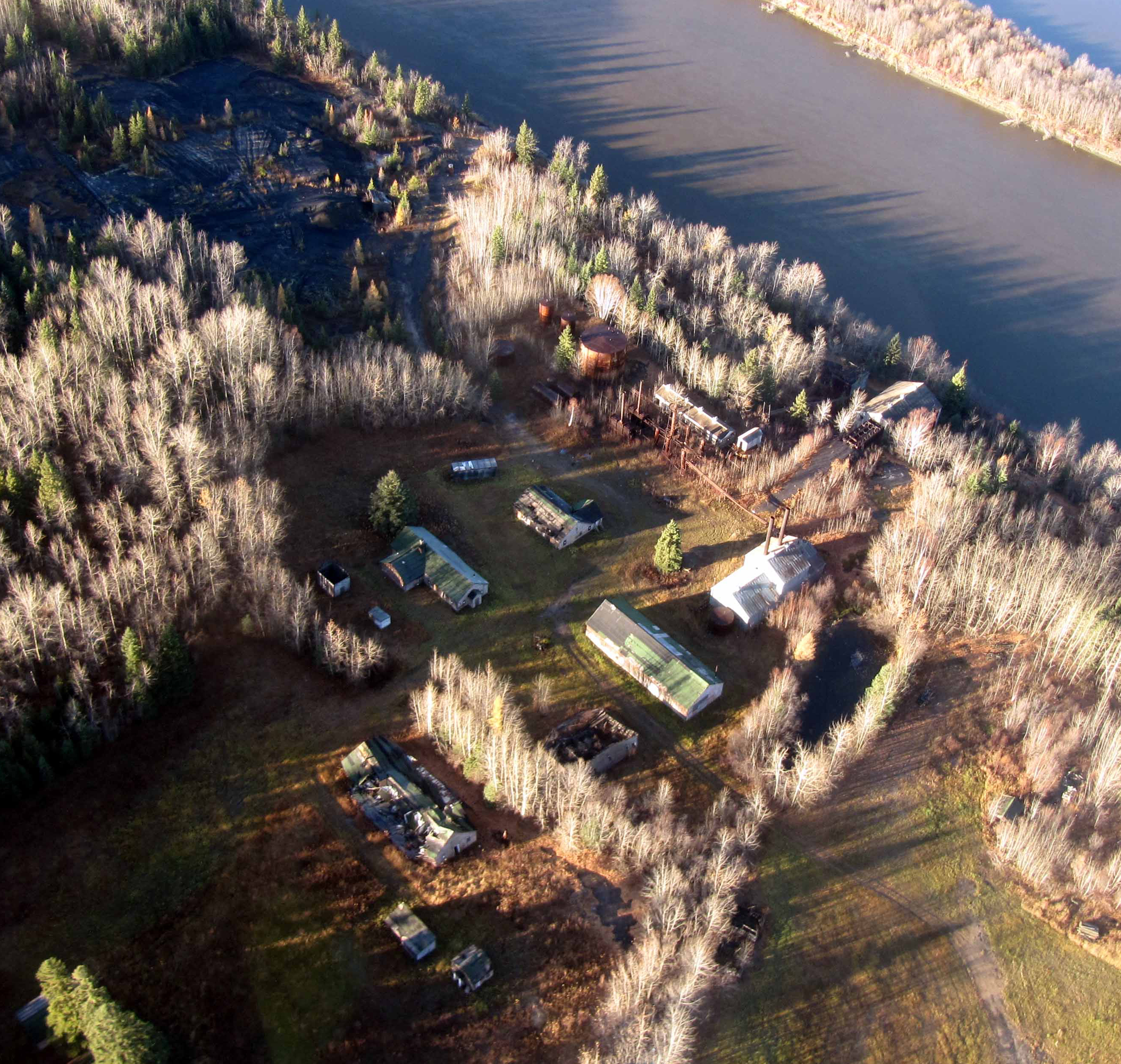
- Bitumount in 2017

- Location of Bitumount in Alberta
- 57°23′10.41″N 111°38′41.57″W
- Type: Provincial Historic Resource
- Location: Alberta, Canada
- Nearest city: Fort McMurray

History
- Founder: R.C. Fitzsimmons
- Built: 1930s, 1940s
- Built for: Oil sands development

Site notes
- Current use: Abandoned
- Owner: Province of Alberta

Bitumount is an abandoned industrial site on the east bank of the Athabasca River about 90 kilometres (60 mi) north of Fort McMurray in northeastern Alberta, Canada. Between 1925 and the 1950s, it was the site of early attempts to extract bitumen from the Athabasca oil sands that contributed to the development of commercially viable extraction processes. The site closed permanently in 1958. Some of the structures at Bitumont were declared Provincial Historic Resources in 1974. As of 2017, the buildings are deteriorating.

== History ==
Work at the site commenced after Robert Cosmas Fitzsimmons incorporated the International Bitumen Company Limited in 1925. Fitzsimmons named the site Bitumount, and by 1930 he had constructed a small oil extraction plant there. It was situated on the edge of the Athabasca River, which was the major transportation corridor in the region at that time. The raw oil sand was crushed and heated in hot water, and the oily substance that rose to the surface was skimmed off.

The company made its first sale of bitumen in Edmonton in 1930, and the Edmonton Journal announced that "those shipments of absolutely pure bitumen are the first and second and only shipments in the history of McMurray tar sands to be made for commercial purposes and it certainly (augurs) well for the future development of the much talked of tar sands of northern Alberta."

Fitzsimmons constructed a small upgrader and other facilities at Bitumount in 1937-1938, but oil prices remained low during the Great Depression and International Bitumen became insolvent.

In 1943, the company was sold to Oil Sands Limited, which was owned by Lloyd Champion. Champion entered into an agreement with the Alberta provincial government to develop a new, larger-scale separation plant. The new plant was built, but Champion failed to provide his share of the funding. The province became the sole investor and, under the direction of Dr. Karl A. Clark, successful tests of Clark's hot-water process, which was much more efficient that the process used by Fitzsimmons, were completed in 1948/49. After that, the plant operated only intermittently, and it closed permanently in 1958. Interest in the Athabasca oil sands had declined, primarily due to the discovery of conventional petroleum at Leduc in 1947.

In 1974, the 1930s plant and the larger 1940s plant at Bitumount were declared Provincial Historic Resources.

== Today ==
As of 2017, the structures at Bitumount have deteriorated. The 1930s plant has collapsed, although much of the equipment is still in place. The 1940s plant was more substantially built and its steel frame and concrete foundations are still in good condition. Many of the wood buildings, including Fitzgerald's original cabin, are in serious disrepair.

== See also ==
- History of the petroleum industry in Canada (oil sands and heavy oil)
