= Karl Clark (chemist) =

Canadian chemist (1888–1966)

Karl A. Clark
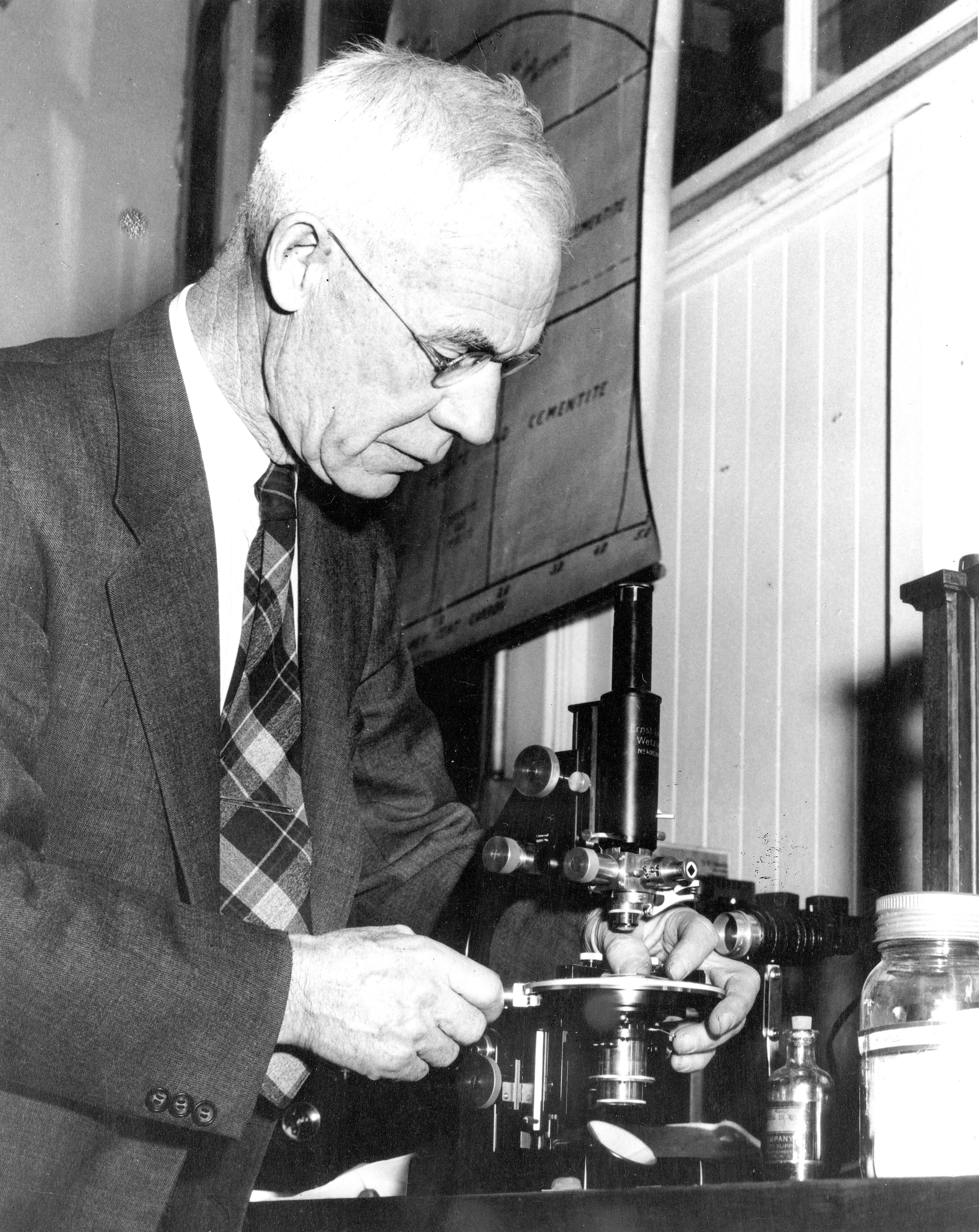
- Clark in his laboratory in the 1930s.
- Born: 20 October 1888; Georgetown, Ontario
- Died: 7 December 1966 (aged 78); Victoria, British Columbia
- Occupation: Chemist
- Known for: Perfecting a process to separate bitumen from oil sands

Karl Adolf Clark (20 October 1888, Georgetown, Ontario – 7 December 1966, Victoria, British Columbia) was a chemist and oil sand researcher. He is best known for perfecting a process that uses hot water and reagents to separate bitumen from oil sands.

== Biography ==
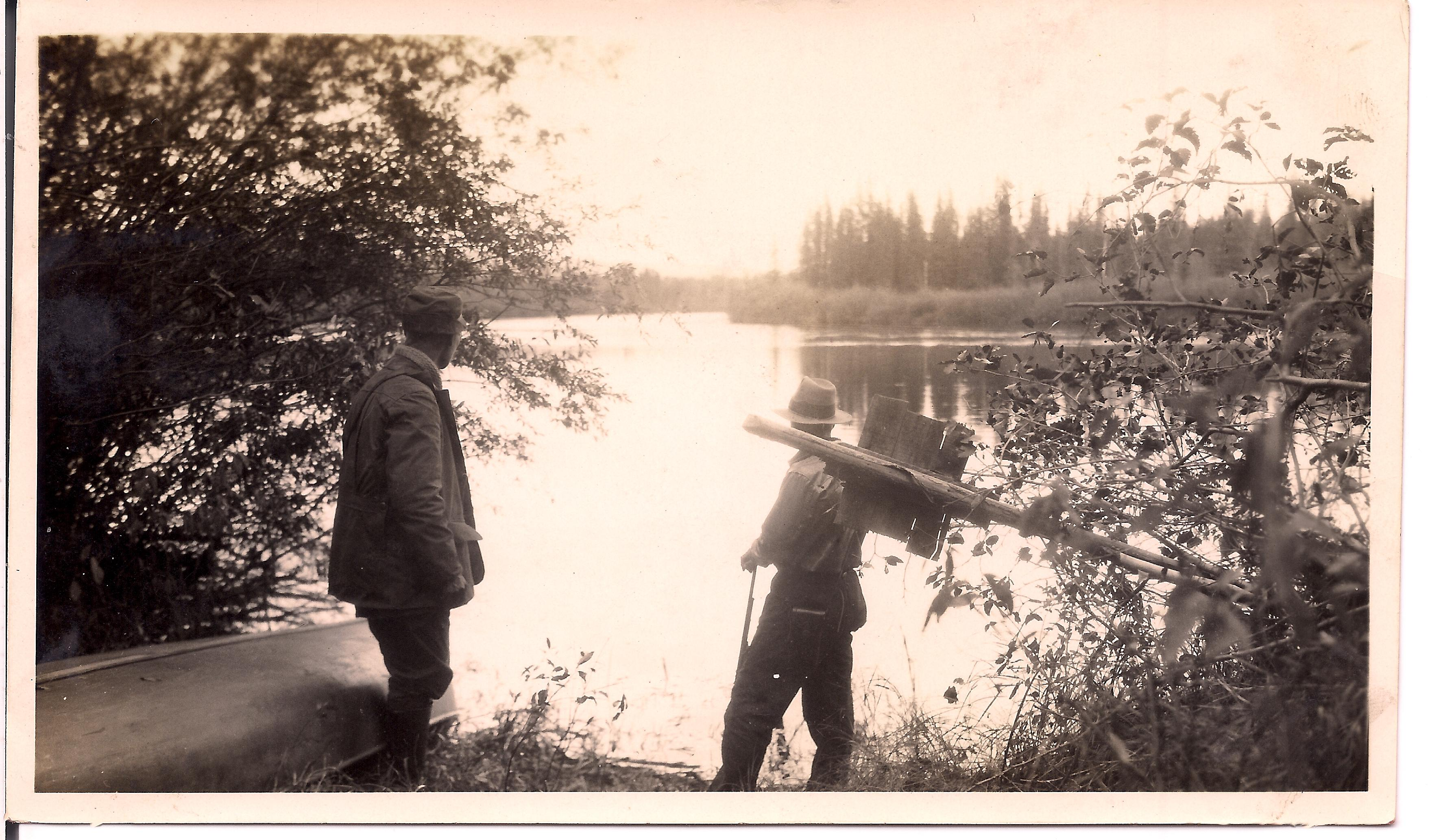
Dr. Karl Clark and guide Romeo Eymundson on the bank of the Athabasca River during one of Clark's oil sands expeditions, 1920s. From the Charles Eymundson fonds.

Clark earned bachelor's and master's degrees from McMaster University before obtaining a Doctorate in Chemistry from the University of Illinois. He began work at the Geological Survey of Canada in 1915, where he became interested in oil sands.

In 1920, he moved to Edmonton and joined the University of Alberta and the Scientific and Industrial Research Council of Alberta (SIRCA), where he began experimenting with separating bitumen from the Athabasca oil sands, a large oil sand deposit in northeastern Alberta.

Clark built a prototype separation plant in the basement of the university's power plant, followed by a larger plant on the outskirts of Edmonton. In 1929, Clark was joined by organic chemist David Pasternack, with whom he investigated ways to remove residual water from separated bitumen; between 1930 and 1951, the two researchers published nine joint scientific papers on oil sands separation.

In 1929, SIRCA patented the process he had developed. Later testing was done on the outskirts of Fort McMurray near Waterways, and further north at Bitumount.[2]

Clark retired from the Department of Mining Engineering at the University of Alberta in 1954 but continued to provide advice to the developing oil sands industry. In 1958, he signed a formal retainer with the Great Canadian Oil Sands consortium, which eventually became a major asset for Suncor. He continued to do research at SIRCA its succeeding organization, the Research Council of Alberta, until 1963.

He died of cancer on December 7, 1966, in Victoria, British Columbia.
