= Minnedosa Ethanol Plant =

Ethanol plant in Manitoba, Canada

Coordinates: 50°15′21″N 99°51′48″W

The Minnedosa Ethanol Plant is an ethanol plant located in Minnedosa, Manitoba. Owned by Cenovus Energy, as part of its 2021 acquisition of Husky Energy, the plant annually produces 130 million liters (34 million U.S. gallons) of ethanol and 126,000 tonnes of dried distillers grain with solubles.

In Canada, ethanol is blended into gasoline. The plant feedstock for the facility is non-food feed-grade wheat purchased from local growers. However, the plant is also capable of using corn as a feedstock. The feedstock is milled, cooked, fermented, distilled, and dehydrated, resulting in ethanol fuel and the remaining waste material is processed into a high-protein feed supplement.

The plant is located near the intersection of Highways 10 and 16. In 2008, a new plant came on line to replace an older plant on the site that, from 1981, had produced 10 million liters (2.6 million U.S. gallons) of ethanol annually. The plant was constructed by PCL Industrial Constructors.
