= 2016 Egypt floods =

Natural disaster in Egypt

The 2016 Egypt floods occurred in the Assuit, Red Sea, Sohag, South Sinai and Qena governorates of Egypt in late October and early November after a cold front from the Mediterranean led to rain and storms that flooded riverbeds. At least 26 people were killed and 72 injured, with the toll potentially higher due to unreported cases arising from drowning, vehicles swept away and collapsed buildings.

Egypt is characterized by its arid expanse and the Nile River, which has long been the nation's lifeline. The unexpected furor of nature can strike with devastating swiftness. In this case, a rare storm descended on the country on 26 October 2016, unleashing torrential rains and ferocious storms that turned a number of parched wadis-dry riverbeds into raging torrents.

What started as a cold front sweeping across the Mediterranean quickly rose to become one of the deadliest flash floods in modern Egyptian history. Over the following days, well into early November, the disaster swept across five governorates: Assiut, Red Sea, Sohag, South Sinai, and Qena. Scores of casualties were engulfed in the raging waters with many reported injured or dead.

Around 32,500 people were directly affected, with homes submerged, roads severed, and livelihoods washed away in hours. This event, often overshadowed by Egypt's more chronic water woes, underscored the precarious dance of this nation with its environment. This occurrence is evidence that, even in a land ravaged by drought, water may be savior and scourge alike.

== Background ==
Historically, Egypt has struggled with such severe climatic disasters. Flash floods destroyed homes in Sinai in 2004 and 2010, killing dozens and displacing thousands. These unfortunate events recur because of its geographical location and exacerbated by underinvestment in resilient infrastructure. This vulnerability exposes communities residing in Sohag and Qena, who are among Egypt's poorest and lack either early warning systems or housing on high ground. Socioeconomic factors such as rural poverty further compels informal settlements in flood-prone wadis, where families have to forage to survive on degraded land.

In response, the Egyptian government in collaboration and cooperation with the army stepped in to provide temporary shelters to the affected and set aside approximately EGP 50 million for restoration of destroyed infrastructure. Rescue agencies, with allocation from EU aid, helped move thousands of inhabitants in the prone areas to safe grounds and distributed essential amenities. Despite assurance from the Egyptian Prime Minister that all hands were on deck to restore the prevailing situation to normalcy, the same was met with heavy criticism citing unpreparedness in such calamities.

Such events are stark reminders that preparedness and mitigation demand climate-adaptive policies, ranging from watershed management to community education. When the waters receded, they left not just scars on the land, but signaled a wake-up call for resilience in a warming world.

2016 Egypt flood
- Date: October 2016
- Location: Egypt
- Deaths: 26

== Geographical impact ==
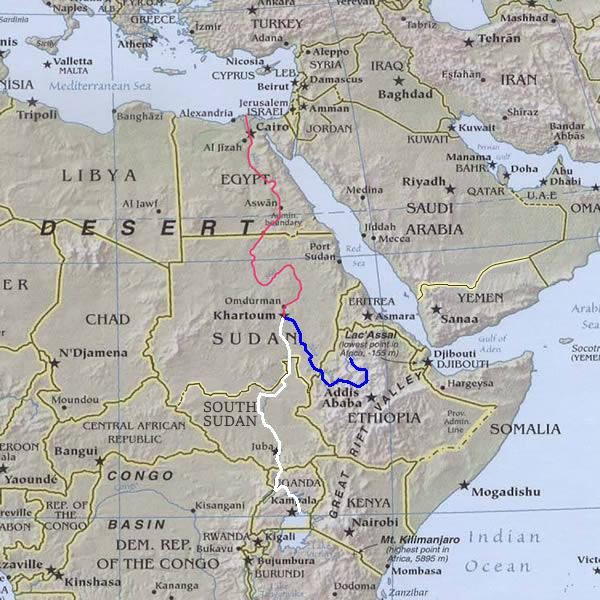
The River Nile route through East Africa.

Water in Egypt is considered a sacred resource, due to the combination of the aridity of the country, very little annual precipitation, and the reliance on the River Nile which serves water needs for consumption, agriculture, power and other industrial use. Egypt is therefore particularly vulnerable to the impacts of climate change such as rising temperatures, rising sea level, reduced rainfall, and increased droughts. While overall precipitation is expected to decrease, these factors combined are contributing to the increase in severity and frequency of heavy rainfall events.

Egypt’s arid climate, frequent droughts and infrequent precipitation increase the risk of flash flooding by reducing soil permeability and increasing water run off. The WMO figures report that 51mm of rain fell in Hurghada, the capitol of the Red Sea Governate, in 24 hours on 27 October 2016. In addition to heavy rainfall, poorly maintained flood gates, and malfunctioning drainage systems - such as the diversion of 70% of the catchment flow from Wadi Had towards the city due to missing drainage structures along Ras-Gharib-El-Sheikh-Fadl Road - intensified the flooding.

The flash flood submerged and destroyed prepared agricultural land in parts of the Delta and Upper Egypt ahead of the winter sowing season which generally takes place in November. Flooding leads to land degradation and soil erosion, which adversely impacts agriculture production and will further impact the livelihood of the rural populations, who are already more severely impacted by poverty.

== Physical impact ==
The 2016 floods affected approximately 32,500 people across several governorates of Egypt including South Sinai, Red Sea, Sohag, Qena and Assuit. The floods led to at least 26 deaths, and 72 injured, however the Egyptian Government reports this number could be higher due to families not reporting their relatives as missing. Reports state that 2 people were killed by electric shocks in Fayed, Ismailiya Governorate; 9 people were killed in the town of Ras Gharib, Red Sea Governate, due to the heavy rain and flooding; and in Sohag Governorate 6 people have been reported as dead due to vehicles being swept up and overturned on the flooded roads.

Deprived areas with poor infrastructure were impacted the most, however across all areas those affected required emergency shelter, sanitation, water and food. Coming into the winter months with a drop in temperatures, the loss of clothes, bedding, electricity, furniture and kitchen supplies was devastating. Many families were also left without their necessary medications and health equipment, and limited access to hospitals.

All affected areas, especially the Red Sea and Sohag Governorates, saw houses damaged and washed away, telephone and power outages, the closure of main roads disrupting traffic linking to cities in Upper Egypt, and closure of schools. Furthermore, the ports of Suez and Port Said were forced to close, directly impacting international trade, travel and transit.

== Response ==
=== Immediate recovery ===
The disaster drew significant media attention both locally and internationally, reporting particularly on mortality and morbidity rates.

Locally, emergency services, authorities, and non-governmental organizations (NGOs) were mobilised. Rescue and evacuation began in the most affected regions, and residents voluntarily distributed essential food and non-food items. In addition to ensuring safety by closing critical infrastructure, the government declared a state of emergency in the affected regions.

Internationally, agencies such as the ACT Alliance partnered with the Coptic Church to rally aid workers to the crisis. Two hundred volunteers were mobilized by the Egyptian Red Crescent (ERC), through its local branches, to assist in evacuation and the delivery of relief services to over 6000 families. The European Union provided €166,000 to help the ERC replenish the relief supplies and WASH services for about 10,000 affected residents. These measures strengthened the immediate response but also highlighted uneven distribution across the affected governorate.

=== Sustained response ===
The government coordinated long-term flood response, particularly focused on infrastructure repairs, livelihood restoration, and community resilience. The civic association and international partners supported the government reconstruction of critical roads and electrical infrastructure, while the Egyptian Army provided 800 temporary shelters.

Prime Minister Sherif Ismail led the visit of senior government officials to the Red Sea Governorate two days after the flood to assess damage and discuss recovery plans. As part of the government’s compensatory efforts,

- Governor Abdalla of Red Sea Governorate, on Friday, October 28, announced the compensatory payment of EGP50,000 and EGP10,000 to the families of those killed and injured by the flood, respectively.
- On October 29, the President, Abdel-Fattah El-Sisi, allocated EGP50 million to support victims, directed towards post-disaster reconstruction and community restoration.
- From the Disaster Management Fund, the Minister of Social Solidarity, Ghada Waly, donated EGP 10,000 to the deceased families and EGP 2,000-5,000 to households with damaged homes.

While financial provision aimed at accelerating recovery, it also highlighted that compensation may not necessarily match the scale of the loss.

=== Criticism ===
Although authorities highlighted their speedy response, several residents noted otherwise, particularly because early warning signs had been issued. For example, as of October 28, no official images or updates had been released by authorities and much of what was available information came from residents and social media. Also, a slow response by the government to drain the floodwater in parts of Qena and Sohag was reported by journalists and residents raised concerns about secondary risk, including exposure to wild animals and temporary water disconnection.

These frustrations contributed to civic demonstrations, during which the residents blocked the Prime Minister's convoy during his visit to Ras Gharib, prompting him to cut short his courtesy visit. In response to the 2016 criticism, Ismail stated that Ras Gharib had not been prioritized in the government’s flood control programme because it had been flood-free for 50 years. Similar discontent had previously led to the governor of Alexandria’s resignation when residents attributed flooding to the poor city’s drainage infrastructure.

== Health consequences ==
=== Short-term impact ===
Flash floods in Egypt present a serious threat to human life and safety. The immediate impact of the 2016 floods was seen in the loss of life caused by torrential rain and rapidly rising waters.

While it is postulated that the true number of deaths was likely higher than the initially reported 26 fatalities and 72 injuries due to underreporting; most of the reported fatalities and injuries occurred as houses collapsed, roads were destroyed, and vehicles were swept away, including a bus killing 6 people, leading to drowning and crush injuries among those caught in the floodwaters.

Flash floods consistently result in high mortality and injury rates, particularly in densely populated areas with poor infrastructure. Vulnerable populations are at greatest risk when floodwaters rise quickly, with drowning and traumatic injuries commonly reported.

The 2016 floods were preceded by a cold front that brought a significant drop in temperature. Combined with the approaching winter season, the destruction of shelter and personal belongings many were left exposed to the elements. This increased vulnerability to weather-related health problems, including hypothermia. Other immediate causes of death or severe injury following flash flooding included electrocution and burns from damaged infrastructure.

Access to healthcare was severely disrupted during the floods, leaving many people without essential medications, particularly those managing chronic conditions. In response, the Egyptian army deployed medical convoys to deliver medicines and provide treatment to affected residents. Health kits were also distributed by Egyptian Red Crescent (ERC) volunteers to displaced and vulnerable populations. In addition, ERC teams trained in emergency response provided basic first aid and psychological support to survivors and their families, helping to address both immediate injuries and the emotional impact of the disaster.

=== Medium to long-term impact ===
There limited epidemiological evidence with regard to the health impacts of floods including to the 2016 floods in Egypt, although it is documented it that in the aftermath of flash flooding there is an increase in communicable diseases. Both waterborne and vector-borne diseases become more prevalent, as flooding creates an environment ideal for the spread of pathogens. Contaminated water supplies and inadequate sanitation heighten the risk of outbreaks such as cholera and leptospirosis.

The displacement of communities and resulting overcrowding further contribute to the spread of disease, including dysentery, cholera, respiratory infections, and skin conditions. The risk of skin infections is particularly high after flash flooding, as injuries such as lacerations from debris are easily exposed to contaminated water.

Socioeconomic conditions also play a critical role in health outcomes after floods. Limited access to adequate shelter, clean water, and healthcare services increases both the risk of infection and the overall vulnerability of affected populations.

There is an associated rise in mental health conditions following flooding often due to physical health conditions, financial concerns and displacement. Post-traumatic stress disorder (PTSD) is one of the most common illnesses reported following floods.

== Lessons learnt ==
=== Early warning and communication ===
The 2016 floods underscored Egypt’s vulnerability to intense autumn and winter rainfall, particularly in areas with limited forecasting and communication capacity. Studies note that individual and institutional behaviour before and during the event shaped both the scale of losses and the pace of recovery. Analysts have recommended improving early warning capacity through investment in advanced forecasting technologies, expansion of weather-monitoring stations, and enhanced data-analysis systems capable of producing localized predictions. According to disaster risk assessments, institutionalised coordination between the Egyptian Meteorological Service and emergency-response agencies would help ensure that forecast information is converted into timely, actionable warnings during future events.

=== Infrastructure resilience ===
Post-event evaluations reported that drainage and flood-control systems in several affected governorates were inadequate for the intensity of the 2016 rainfall. Experts argue that strengthening resilience requires integrating upgraded stormwater and groundwater conveyance systems into broader urban development plans. Recommendations include phased modernization of underground pipe networks and the adoption of hydraulic standards that consider future climate projections. The installation of a pressure pipeline for municipal water supplies has created additional pressure on the need to mitigate flash flooding.

=== Preparedness and response capacity ===
Limited preparedness and low community risk awareness was identified as major factors that amplified the impacts of the 2016 floods. Disaster assessments noted gaps in emergency-response training and coordination structures. According to the World Bank, an estimated 68% of preventable disaster-related economic losses in comparable contexts stem from shortcomings in emergency planning, underscoring the relevance of these findings to the 2016 event.

=== Recovery ===
Recovery conditions varied considerably across regions following the 2016 floods, with remote areas experiencing delays due to transportation disruptions. Reports highlight that local governments often lack long-term fundiPost-disasterl capacity to support recovery. Analyses also observed that reconstruction efforts tended to prioritise physical infrastructure, with limited community participation and insufficient attention to livelihoods and social recovery. Recommendation post disaster institutions emphasize incorporating post- disaster recovery planning into broader climate adaptation strategies.

=== Ecological and environmental management ===
Environmental assessments of the 2016 floods documented soil erosion, salinization, and localized groundwater contamination. Experts recommend measures such as re-vegetation, construction of small flood-storage and detention structures, and improved drainage and rainwater collection systems to enhance long-term resilience. Long-term monitoring of climate effects on water and land resources is regarded as a key component of sustainable post disaster recovery.

=== Coordination and institutional responsibilities ===
The 2016 event highlighted challenges in coordination among national, governorate, and local authorities. Reviews found that the unclear division of responsibilities hindered rescue and reconstruction efforts. Analysts recommend establishing a cross-departmental disaster-management system encompassing housing, water resources, transportation, and emergency services, with clearly defined roles and institutionalised coordination mechanisms.
