= Conklin, Alberta =

Conklin
- Hamlet
- Location of Conklin in Alberta
- Coordinates: 55.6311°N 111.0789°W
- Country: Canada
- Province: Alberta
- Census division: No. 16
- Specialized municipality: R.M. of Wood Buffalo

Government
  - Type: Unincorporated
  - Mayor: Sandy Bowman
  - Governing body: Wood Buffalo Municipal Council: Mike Allen; Ty Brandt; Lance Bussieres; Luana Bussieres; Don Scott; Jennifer Vardy; Kendrick Cardinal; Greg "Cowboy" Marcel; Stu Wigle; Kyle Vandecasteyen

Area (2021)
  - Land: 16.29 km^{2} (6.29 sq mi)
- Elevation: 575 m (1,886 ft)

Population (2021)
  - Total: 154
  - Density: 9.5/km^{2} (25/sq mi)
- Time zone: UTC−06:00 (Alberta Time)

Conklin is a hamlet in northern Alberta, Canada within the Regional Municipality (RM) of Wood Buffalo. It is located on Highway 881 between Fort McMurray and Lac La Biche. It lies near the west end of Christina Lake at an elevation of 575 metres (1,886 ft), and was named for John Conklin, a railroad employee.

The hamlet is located in Census Division No. 16 and in the federal riding of Fort McMurray-Athabasca.

== History ==
The hamlet of Conklin was named for John Conklin, a railroad employee. It was originally situated at the extreme northwestern end of Christina Lake, adjacent to its outlet at the Jackfish River. When the Alberta and Great Waterways Railway (which eventually became part of the Northern Alberta Railway and later the Athabasca Northern Railway) reached Conklin in 1921, the town was relocated alongside the railway tracks.

Conklin was an important centre for the local fur trade from 1940 to 1960. Mink pelts from several mink farms in the area were transferred by canoe and dogsled to the railway siding at Conklin for shipment to markets.

Christina Lake was the site of commercial fishing soon after Conklin was settled. From 1940 to 1960 there was heavy commercial fishing in Christina Lake, and a fish processing plant was located at the outlet to the Jackfish River.

Conklin lies within the Athabasca Oil Sands region, and Cenovus Energy has been operating its Christina Lake project in the area since 2000. The Christina Lake project is a steam-assisted gravity drainage (SAGD) project that recovers bitumen from the McMurray Formation, which lies at a depth of 375 m (1,230 ft) at that location.

== Demographics ==
Population history of Conklin
Year	Pop.	±%
1951	82	—
1956	59	−28.0%
1961	69	+16.9%
1966	129	+87.0%
1971	119	−7.8%
1976	133	+11.8%
1981	116	−12.8%
1986	138	+19.0%
1991	191	+38.4%
1991A	205	+7.3%
1996	145	−29.3%
1996A	157	+8.3%
2001	166	+5.7%
2006	199	+19.9%
2011	211	+6.0%
2016	185	−12.3%
2021	154	−16.8%
Source: Statistics Canada

In the 2021 Census of Population conducted by Statistics Canada, Conklin had a population of 154 living in 57 of its 91 total private dwellings, a change of −16.8% from its 2016 population of 185. With a land area of 16.29 km^{2} (6.29 sq mi), it had a population density of 9.5/km^{2} (24.5/sq mi) in 2021.

The population of Conklin according to the 2018 municipal census conducted by the Regional Municipality of Wood Buffalo is 229, a decrease from its 2012 municipal census population count of 318.

As a designated place in the 2016 Census of Population conducted by Statistics Canada, Conklin had a population of 185 living in 71 of its 112 total private dwellings, a change of −12.3% from its 2011 population of 211. With a land area of 16.32 km^{2} (6.30 sq mi), it had a population density of 11.3/km^{2} (29.4/sq mi) in 2016.

== See also ==
- List of communities in Alberta
- List of designated places in Alberta
- List of hamlets in Alberta
