= MEG Energy =

Canadian oil sands production company

MEG Energy Corp.
- Formerly: McCaffery Energy Group Inc.
- Type: Subsidiary
- Industry: Oil and gas
- Founded: 1999; 27 years ago
- Founder: William J McCaffery
- Headquarters: Calgary, Alberta, Canada
- Key people: Darlene Gates (President and CEO); Ryan Kubik (CFO)
- Products: Petroleum; Electricity
- Revenue: ▼CA$5.149 billion (2024)
- Net income: ▼CA$0.522 billion (2024)
- Total assets: ▼CA$6.744 billion (2024)
- Total equity: ▲CA$4.553 billion (2024)
- Number of employees: 473
- Parent: Cenovus Energy
- Website: www.megenergy.com

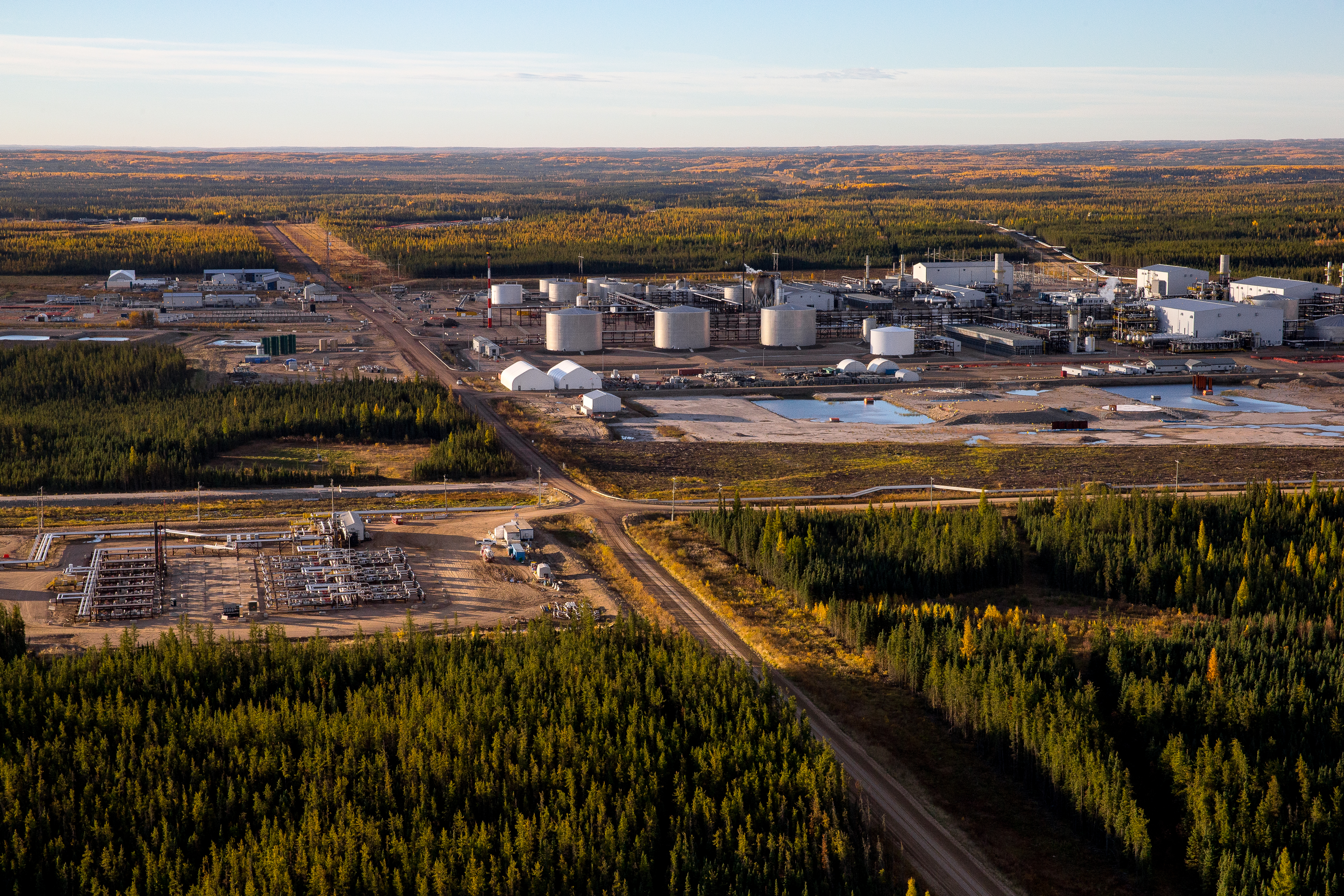
MEG Energy's Christina Lake facility.

MEG Energy is a pure play Canadian oil sands producer engaged in exploration in the Athabasca oil sands.

All of its oil reserves are more than 1,000 feet (300 m) below the surface, so the company depends on steam-assisted gravity drainage and associated technology (heavy bitumen must first be brought to the surface). The company's main thermal project is Christina Lake.

85-megawatt cogeneration plants are used to produce the steam used in SAGD which is required to bring bitumen to the surface. The excess heat and electricity produced at its plants is then sold to Alberta's power grid. Its proven reserves have been independently pegged at 1.7 billion barrels (270×10^{6} m^{3}) and probable reserves 3.7 billion barrels (590×10^{6} m^{3}) by GLJ Petroleum Consultants Ltd.

Only 300 billion barrels (48×10^{9} m^{3}) of the 1.6 trillion barrels (250×10^{9} m^{3}) of bitumen in Alberta is considered recoverable under current technology. The value of those reserves is over $19.8 billion.

Within nine months of going public it reached large cap company status after a small cap IPO. As recently as 2007 it was a junior oil company.

== History ==
MEG Energy was founded in 1999 as McCaffrey Energy Group Inc by CEO and President Bill McCaffrey, Director and Corporate Secretary David Wizinsky and former Director Steve Turner.

It went public with an IPO of $660 million in August 2010. At the time it was considered a $9.7 billion equity cap company. The Christina Lake project first received approval from the government in 2008, it was one of six oil megaprojects in Canada that year.

On April 14, 2005, CNOOC Ltd, China's third-largest oil and natural gas company, acquired a 16.69% stake in MEG for CA$150 million (13.6 million common shares). In October 2018, the firm even received a hostile takeover bid from Husky Energy.

In 2022, a year after expanding its facility, it formed the Pathways Alliance along with several other companies. On May 1, 2024, Derek Evans stepped down from his role as CEO and Darlene Gates was appointed as President & Chief Executive Officer.

In August 2025, MEG agreed to be acquired by Cenovus Energy for CA$7.9 billion in a cash-and-stock deal, two months after rejecting a hostile acquisition offer from rival Strathcona Resources for $6bn. On November 13, Cenovus announced that it had completed the purchase of MEG Energy.

== Production ==
In 2012 bitumen production averaged 28,773 bpd, +2,168 bpd versus the previous year. By the second quarter of 2013 average production had reached 32,144 bpd, +1,715 bdp. Also up is the realized oil price per barrel: $53.98 vs $45.59.

According to the company's 2024 Business Update presentation, as of September 30, 2024, MEG's Christina Lake operations produced 102,600 bpd.

== Christina Lake ==
MEG's interest in Christina Lake includes 80 blocks/sections. It is a three phase project that was operating at 12.4% (26,000 bbls/d) of total expected production capacity at the end of 2010. Since 2009 the first two phases were producing, albeit at a low level because construction of phase 2B (design capacity 40% larger than phase 1 and 2A combined) didn't begin until 2011. When combined with phase three, total production will exceed 200,000 barrels per day (32,000 m^{3}/d) with 2020 production estimated at 260,000 bbls/d. The pipeline system used to carry bitumen out and diluent in is the 343-kilometre (213 mi) Access Pipeline which MEG co owns with Devon ARL Corp.

The company operates the Christina Lake Aerodrome. Cenovus Energy also produces at Christina Lake.

== Initial production process ==
Initially two horizontally parallel wells are created. Oil is directed to the lowest well after injecting steam into the one above it in order to heat the area so that the liquid in the area flows downwards (allows for the separation of oil from sand). The steam used comes from MEG's cogeneration plants.
