= Christina River (Alberta) =

River in Alberta, Canada

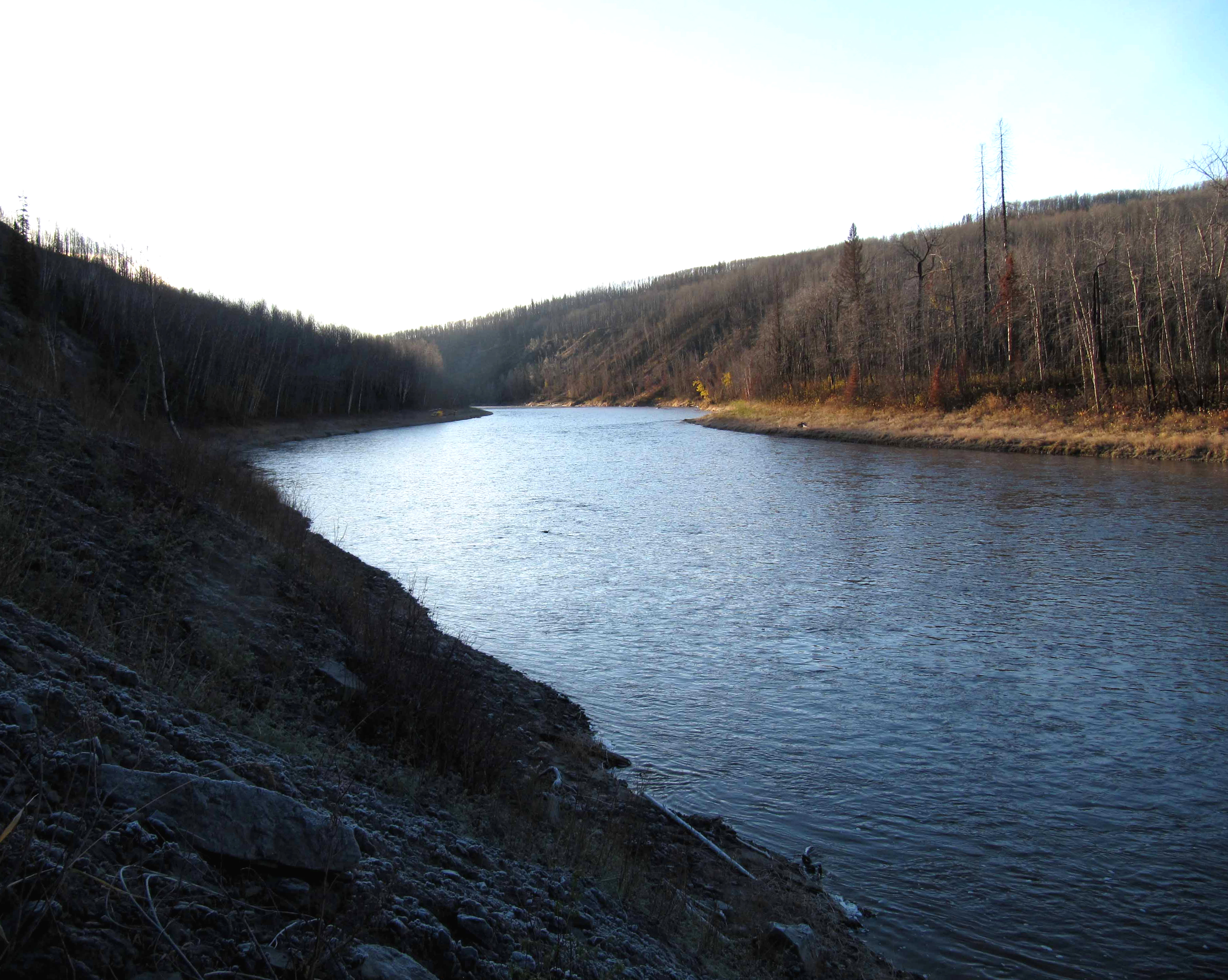
- The Christine River in late Autumn, near its confluence with the Clearwater River.

Location
- Country: Canada
- Province: Alberta

Physical characteristics
- Source: Christina Lake
  - location: Wood Buffalo, Alberta, Canada
  - coordinates: 55°37′21″N 110°52′42″W
- Source confluence: Jackfish River
- Mouth: Clearwater River

The Christina River is located in the Wood Buffalo region of north-eastern Alberta, Canada. The Christina is a tributary of the Clearwater River and was named to honour Christine Gordon, who was the first white women to live permanently in the Fort McMurray area.

== Course and drainage basin ==
The Christina River arises close to Christina Lake near the town of Conklin and is part of Christina Lake's 1,250-square-kilometre (480 sq mi) drainage basin. Christina Lake's waters reach the Christina River via the short (11 kilometres (7 mi) long) Jackfish River. The Christina then wanders northward for about 110 kilometres (68 mi) to join the Clearwater River about 16 kilometres (10 mi) east of Fort McMurray. The waters eventually reach the Arctic Ocean via the Athabasca and Mackenzie Rivers.

== History ==
The Christina River and Christina Lake were named to honour Christine Gordon, originally from Scotland, who was the first white woman to live permanently in the Fort McMurray area, where she remained until her death in the 1940s. She was highly respected by the community, including the First Nations and Métis. Gordon, partly based on knowledge gleaned from a Scottish home nursing book, made her own treatments for illnesses and injuries. She could "splint a broken arm, lower a fever, and mix herbal remedies." By 1914 she owned and operated a post in Fort McMurray, in competition with the Hudson's Bay Company.

== See also ==
- List of rivers of Alberta
