= Robert Peabody =

Robert Peabody may refer to:

- Robert Swain Peabody (1845–1917), Boston architect
- Robert J. Peabody (born 1956), president and CEO of Husky Energy Inc.
- Robert Peabody, a technician who received a fatal dose of radiation in the Wood River Junction criticality accident
