= Oil Sands Alliance =

Alliance of Canada's oil sands producers

Oil Sands Alliance, formerly the Pathways Alliance, is an industry association of Canada's largest oil sands producers—Canadian Natural Resources, Cenovus Energy, Imperial Oil, Suncor Energy and ConocoPhillips— together representing about 95% of Canada’s oil sands production, established on June 15, 2022. Their original stated goal was the achievement of "net-zero by 2050".

Pathways' president is Kendall Dilling. According to Pathways, the alliance's decarbonization work has amounted to $1.8 billion from 2021 to November 2023. Their major proposed project is a potential $16.5 billion carbon capture and storage network that would be built in northern Alberta. which initially included a March 2023 request that the federal government cover 75% of the cost.

In June 2024, with the introduction of the federal government's anti-green-washing amendments to Canada's Competition Act, the Alliance removed all of their relevant content from their website. While under pressure to respond to removal of their considerable greenhouse gas emissions, the oilsands industry has remained "largely silent" as of September 2024.

== History ==
The Canada's Oil Sands Innovation Alliance (COSIA) was established on 2 March 2012 by oil sands producers to accelerate responses to Environmental Priority Areas (EPAs). It was described in a 2013 Geoscience Canada journal article as a "new kind of industry association" that was created in the early stages of a new environment management regime in Alberta—2010 to 2013.

On 19 June 2021, with the price of oil plummeting during the COVID-19 pandemic the Oil Sands Pathways to Net-Zero was unveiled. It predated the increase in the price of oil and included a call for the federal government to finance 75% of the proposed projects.

By November 2021, Suncor, Imperial, Canadian Natural Resources, MEG Energy, ConocoPhillips, and Cenovus, were testing their Oil Sands Pathway Alliance campaign with focus groups.

Oil Sands Pathways to Net Zero Alliance, Canada's Oil Sands Innovation Alliance (COSIA), and the Oil Sands Community Alliance (OSCA)

In June 2022, the Oil Sands Pathways to Net Zero Alliance described their plan for reaching net-zero that "centers on carbon capture and storage (CCUS) processes and "other emerging technologies like direct air capture".

On June 15, 2022, Canadian Natural Resources, Cenovus Energy, Imperial Oil, MEG Energy, Suncor Energy and ConocoPhillips established Pathways Alliance.

In 2022, Pathways Alliance "announced that exploratory drilling would begin that winter to create underground reservoirs in northern Alberta, where carbon captured during the process of oil sands extraction would be stored. The proposal, which may take several years to gain regulatory approval, includes the construction of a pipeline to transport captured carbon from over twenty oil sands facilities to an underground storage facility near Cold Lake".

By January 2023, Phase 1 was under construction with a $500 million already invested by the consortium. On 4 January 2023, the Pathways Alliance and the Alberta Government entered into a Carbon Sequestration Evaluation Agreement.

In March 2023, Pathways president, Kendall Dilling, called on the federal government to financially support their CCUS projects. That same month, Greenpeace Canada filed a complaint against Pathways Alliance with the Competition Bureau, alleging that the consortium had "been running a misleading advertisement campaign to influence federal regulations and manipulate public support for oil sands development."

An October 2023 Greenpeace article said that the members of the Alliance—who control approximately 63% of Canada's total oil production—in 2022 collectively posted a record profit of over $35 billion.

According to a 4 October 2023 Deloitte Canada report, with the completion of the TransMountain pipeline in 2024, the price of Western Canada Select—the benchmark Canadian heavy oil—price differential will decrease and the WCS price will increase as oil production expands. The report also said that the pipeline expansion will result in an increase in Canadian oil production—which in effect means Pathways Alliance members—in 2024 and 2025 to an estimated total representing more than the total production from 2018 to 2023."

In June 2024, as the new federal anti-green-washing legislation was about to come into effect, Pathways Alliance removed all their webpage content regarding the benefits of their proposed CCS system. As of mid-September 2024, public communications by oilsands companies remained mute about their response to reduce its greenhouse gas emissions.

In a rebrand in February 2026, Pathways Alliance is now known as Oil Sands Alliance to represent its focus on industry growth.

== Proposed CCS system ==
Pathways Alliance's major project is a potential $16.5 billion carbon capture and storage network to be constructed in northern Alberta. As of May 2024, the proposed CCS network aims to capture CO_{2} emissions from over 20 oilsands facilities in northern Alberta and transport them via a 400-kilometer pipeline to an underground storage hub near Cold Lake.

According to a 2023 Bloomberg News report, Pathways Alliance members had requested increased financial support in 2022 and 2023 from the Alberta government and the federal government before "greenlighting construction" of the $16 billion CCS network that they say would cut "22 million metric tons of emissions by 2030". In 2022, Pathways had requested that the federal government cover 75% of the cost. As of 28 October 2023, the federal government confirmed that their offer of 50% tax credits towards the building costs of CCS plants is already "robust" and would not be increased. The Alberta government were in discussion with Pathways with regard to the provincial financial supports to the oil and gas industry's potential CCS project.

Concerns have been raised about the Pathways' reliance on the expensive carbon capture and storage technology (CCS), which can only be extracted and stored at "large industrial sites". In 2023, Greenpeace said that since the majority of emissions from fossil fuels comes from their consumption so CCS would not reduce those emissions. The risk of leakage in the storage process was another concern.

Ecojustice on behalf of the Athabasca Chipewyan First Nation, Alberta Wilderness Association, No to CO_{2} Landowner's Group, Environmental Defence, and Climate Action Network requested the Alberta Energy Regulator to conduct a comprehensive environmental impact assessment (EIA) for the Pathways Alliance's proposed $16.5 billion carbon capture and storage (CCS) project. Their concerns include water consumption, pollution, and safety issues related to the CCS project. The groups contend that due to the enormous scope of the proposed CCS project, the regulator should undertake a single, comprehensive environmental impact assessment rather than reviewing the project piecemeal through separate applications, the first of which the Pathways Alliance started submitting in March.

== Financial considerations ==
The 2023 analysis by Wood Mackenzie, a global energy consultancy, highlights that the proposed Pathways CCS project faces relatively high costs per tonne of emissions reduced, partly due to the remote location of Alberta's oilsands operations. While Canada's carbon capture incentives rank among the most attractive globally, they primarily focus on supporting the construction of facilities rather than providing financial assistance based on the actual operational emissions sequestered. Consequently, companies must evaluate whether the existing incentives are sufficient to proceed with the project.

According to a 2023 report by the Canadian Climate Institute, financial projections indicate that governments face a delicate balancing act when it comes to providing the appropriate level of support for carbon capture and storage (CCS) projects at oilsands operations.

== Cap on oil and gas emissions ==
While Pathways Alliance says that it does not oppose a cap on oil and gas emissions, they raise concerns that a cap that is "too restrictive" would limit the oil and gas industry's ability to "grow its production".

== COP28 ==
Pathways Alliance members participated at the 2023 United Nations Climate Change Conference (COP28) in Dubai from 30 November until 12 December 2023.

== See also ==
- Athabasca oil sands
- Canadian Natural Resources
- Cenovus Energy
- Imperial Oil
- MEG Energy
- Suncor Energy
- ConocoPhillips
- Syncrude
