= John Lau =

Canadian businessman

- 刘钱崧
- Born: John Ching Sung Lau

John Ching Sung Lau (Chinese: 刘钱崧) was the former Chief Executive Officer and President of Husky Energy. Prior to joining Husky, he served in various senior executive roles in Cheung Kong (Holdings) and Hutchison Whampoa Limited group of companies.

== Career ==
John Lau took over the position as Chief Executive Officer and President of Husky Energy in 2000. He retired from Husky Energy in 2011 and continues to be advisor and consultant to global oil and gas companies.

== Awards ==
John Lau was a recipient of the Queen’s Golden Jubilee Medal, the Alberta Centennial Award, and the Saskatchewan Centennial Medal. He also received the Distinguished Service Award from the Province of Saskatchewan.

On 26 August 2000, John was named an honorary chief of the Frog Lake First Nation.
