= Glenn Nielsen =

Canadian energy industry businessman

Glenn E. Nielson
- Born: May 22, 1903; Aetna, Alberta, Canada
- Died: October 19, 1998 (aged 95)
- Known for: founder of Husky Refining Company

Glenn E. Nielson (May 26, 1903 – October 19, 1998) was the founder of Husky Refining Company, now Husky Energy. He was nicknamed "Mr. Asphalt" because of his efforts to expand the use of asphalt in roads.

Nielson was born in Aetna, Alberta, Canada and raised in Cardston, Alberta. He graduated from Raymond Agricultural College and served missions for the Church of Jesus Christ of Latter-day Saints (LDS Church) in England and California in the 1920s. Nielson received his bachelor's degree in economics from the University of Alberta.

He began his involvement in the oil industry in 1938 with the purchase of the Park Refining Company (Cody, WY) from Wyoming oil pioneer Valentine M. Kirk. Nielson's ongoing expansion in the industry included the 1951 purchase of a controlling interest in the Kirk & Krueger Drilling Company, started in 1945 by Valentine Kirk's son Carroll J. Kirk.

After moving to the United States, Nielson became an American citizen.

In 1966, Nielson became the chairman of the Business-Industry Political Action Committee.

In the LDS Church, Nielson was president of the Big Horn Stake based in Lovell, Wyoming. In 1969, he became the director of Brigham Young University's development office. From 1973 to 1977 Nielson was the president of the Washington D.C. Mission. Nielson also served as a regional representative of the Twelve and was a stake patriarch at the time of his death.

Nielson married Olive Wood in the Cardston Alberta Temple in 1928. They had three daughters and two sons.
