= Christina Lake (Alberta) =

Lake in Alberta, Canada

- Location within Alberta
- Location: Wood Buffalo, Alberta
- Coordinates: 55°37′21″N 110°52′42″W
- Primary inflows: Sunday Creek, Birch Creek
- Primary outflows: Jackfish River
- Catchment area: 1,250 square kilometres (480 sq mi)
- Basin countries: Canada
- Max. length: 18 km (11 mi)
- Max. width: 2 km (1.2 mi)
- Surface area: 21.3 km^{2} (8.2 sq mi)
- Average depth: 17.3 m (57 ft)
- Max. depth: 32.9 m (108 ft)
- Surface elevation: 556 m (1,824 ft)

Christina Lake is an elongate lake in northern Alberta, Canada, located near Highway 881 east of Conklin, between Lac La Biche and Fort McMurray. Christina Lake and the Christina River are named to honour Christine Gordon, originally from Scotland, who was the first white woman to live permanently in the Fort McMurray area.

== Water and watershed ==
Christina Lake lies at an elevation of 556 m (1,824 ft) and has a total area of 21.3 km^{2} (8.2 sq mi). It has a mean depth of 17.3 m (57 ft), a maximum depth of 32.9 m (108 ft), and a drainage area of 1,250 square kilometres (480 sq mi). The lake has six permanent inlets and one permanent outlet, the Jackfish River at its western end. The Jackfish River flows 11 kilometres (6.8 mi) before it empties into the Christina River, a tributary of the Clearwater River. The waters eventually reach the Arctic Ocean via the Athabasca and Mackenzie Rivers.

== Lake History ==
Christina Lake and the Christina River were named to honour Christine Gordon, originally from Scotland, who was the first white woman to live permanently in the Fort McMurray area, where she remained until her death in the 1940s. She was highly respected by the community, including the First Nations and Métis. Gordon, partly based on knowledge gleaned from a Scottish home nursing book, made her own treatments for illnesses and injuries. She could "splint a broken arm, lower a fever, and mix herbal remedies." By 1914 she owned and operated a post in Fort McMurray, in competition with the Hudson's Bay Company.

The hamlet of Conklin was originally situated on the extreme northwestern end of Christina Lake, adjacent to the outlet at the Jackfish River. When the Alberta and Great Waterways Railway (which eventually became part of the Northern Alberta Railway and later the Athabasca Northern Railway) reached Conklin in 1921, the town was relocated alongside the railway tracks.

Christina Lake was an important centre for the local fur trade from 1940 to 1960. Mink pelts from several mink farms in the area were transferred by canoe and dogsled to the railway siding for shipment to markets.

From 1940 to 1960 there was heavy commercial fishing in Christina Lake, and a fish processing plant was located at the outlet to the Jackfish River.

== Forest Fires ==
The Lac la Biche Forest that surrounds some of Christina Lake experiences a higher-than-average number of lightning storms.

== Resource Management ==
=== Timber ===
There are small stands of conifers, mixed wood and pure aspen in the area, but most of the timber is not merchantable.

=== Energy resources ===
Christina Lake lies within the Athabasca Oil Sands region, and Cenovus Energy has been operating its Christina Lake project in the area since 2000. The Christina Lake project is a steam-assisted gravity drainage (SAGD) project that recovers bitumen from the McMurray Formation, which lies at a depth of 375 m (1,230 ft) at that location. Cenovus considers the Christina Lake project to be "top-tier", one of their "two industry-leading oil sands producing projects" with "huge potential for growth."

In addition to bitumen, the area hosts natural gas reserves, which were already being extracted in 1991.
