= Husky Energy =

Canadian petroleum company (1938–2021)

- Type: Public (1953–87, 2000–2021)
- Traded as: TSX: HSE
- Industry: Petroleum
- Founded: 1 January 1938 (Wyoming); 9 December 1953 (Canada)
- Defunct: 31 March 2021
- Fate: Acquired by Cenovus Energy
- Headquarters: Western Canadian Place, Calgary, Alberta
- Website: huskyenergy.com (defunct)

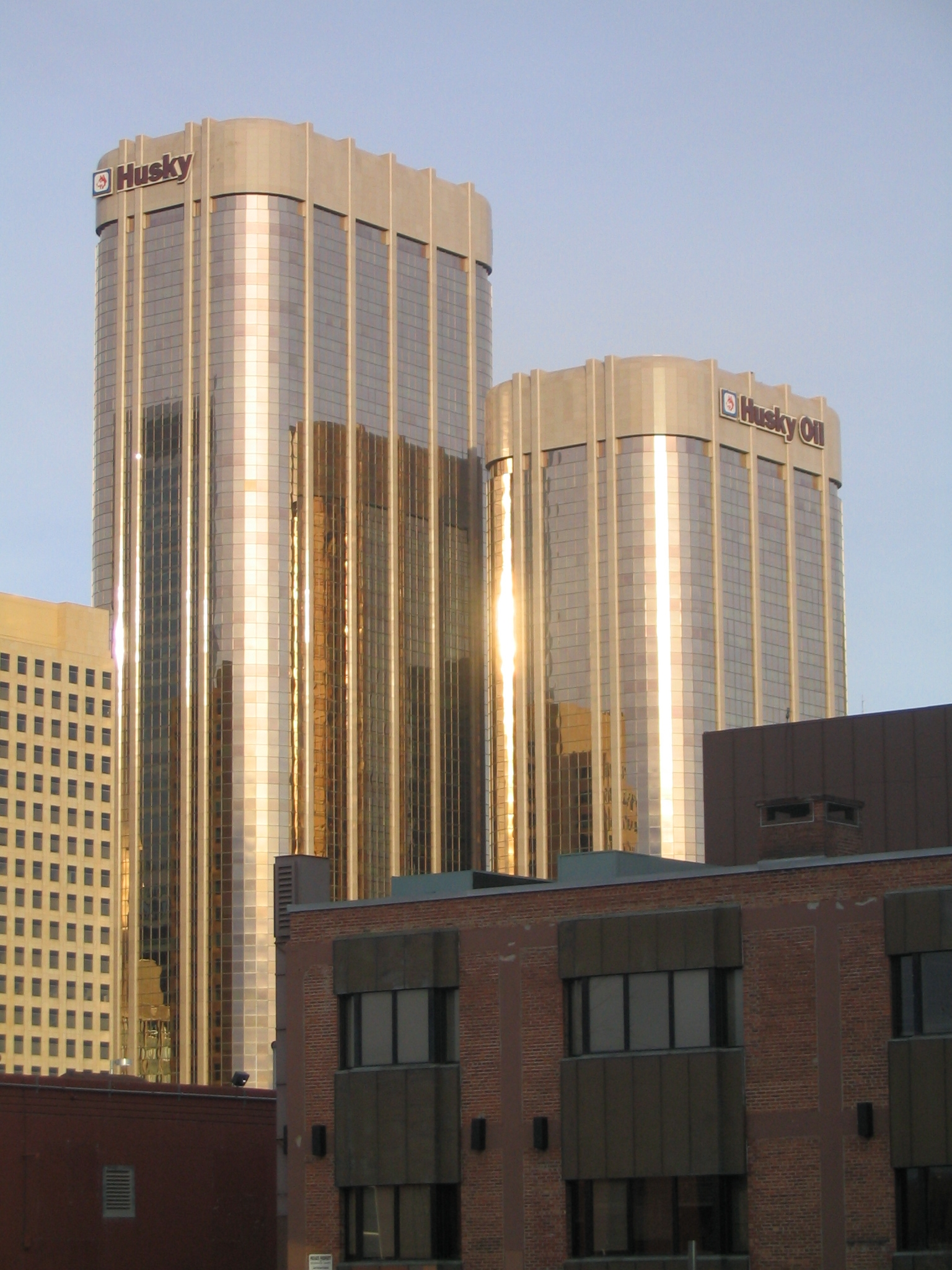
Husky Oil headquarters in Calgary

Husky Energy Inc. was a Canadian petroleum company that existed from 1938 to 2021. It operated in Western and Atlantic Canada, the United States and the Asia Pacific region, with upstream and downstream business segments. In the 2020 Forbes Global 2000, Husky Energy was ranked as the 1443rd-largest public company in the world.

In January 2021, Husky was acquired by Cenovus Energy. Most of its retail operations were sold to Federated Co-operatives and Parkland Corporation later that year; Husky's remaining travel centre business (which operated under the Esso brand under a 2015 agreement with Imperial Oil) was sold to BVD Petroleum in 2026.

== History ==
Husky Energy was founded in 1938 in Cody, Wyoming as the Husky Refining Company, with the acquisition by Glenn Nielsen of assets of the 4-year-old Park Refining Company from founder Valentine Monroe Kirk. The first refinery was in Cody, with a second constructed later in Riverton, Wyoming.

In 1946, the Company relocated to Canada, with the Riverton refinery moved to Lloydminster, Alberta to take advantage of the expanding asphalt and heavy oil opportunities in the area. A wholly owned subsidiary, Husky Oil and Refining Ltd., was created and headquartered in Calgary, Alberta, Canada. The Cody refinery continued operations well into the 1970s, producing primarily asphalt. The refinery was razed in the late 1990s.

In 1978–1979, amid a bidding war between Petro-Canada and Occidental Petroleum, controlling ownership of Husky was acquired by Alberta Gas Trunk Lines (which in 1980 became NOVA Corporation).

In 1986, Hong Kong-based Li Ka-shing acquired 43% of Husky, and in 1991 he purchased NOVA's remaining interests for CA$217 million (equivalent to $430 million in 2025), expanding his stake to 95%.

In 1998, Husky purchased Mohawk Oil, the largest independent chain of consumer filling stations in Western Canada.

In 2000, the company acquired Renaissance Energy, controlled by Li Ka-shing.

In 2003, it acquired the Canadian unit of the American-based Marathon Oil Corporation.

In November 2017, Husky acquired the a refinery in Superior, Wisconsin from Calumet Specialty Products Partners LP for $492 million.

In 2019, the company dropped a bid to acquire MEG Energy after failing to get shareholder support.

In 2020, Cenovus Energy offered to acquire Husky for $3.8 billion; Li would own 27.2% of the merged company. The acquisition was completed in January 2021.

=== Incidents ===
On April 26, 2018, Husky's Superior, Wisconsin refinery experienced a series of explosions and fires, resulting in 11 injuries, one of which was critical. A mandatory evacuation was issued by the Mayor of Superior, Jim Paine, after the fire spread and caused multiple additional explosions, with Douglas County (of which Superior is the county seat) declaring a state of emergency. The black smoke resulting from the explosions and fire traveled as far south as Solon Springs, 22 miles south of the refinery.

== Operations ==
Its offshore business includes the Asia Pacific and Atlantic regions. In Asia Pacific, Husky's Liwan Gas Project in the South China Sea achieved first production in 2014. The liquids-rich BD field offshore of Indonesia came online in 2017, and the company is advancing additional shallow water fields.

Husky also has a portfolio of oil sands leases, encompassing some 2,500 square kilometres in the Fort McMurray region of northern Alberta. Its Sunrise Energy Project achieved first production in early 2015.

In the Atlantic region, off Canada's East Coast, the company holds interests in 20 exploration licenses and producing properties at Terra Nova and White Rose. In the United States, the company owns a refinery in Lima, Ohio, a refinery in Superior, Wisconsin and holds a 50% ownership interest with BP in the BP-Husky Toledo Refinery in Oregon, Ohio.

=== Assets and holdings ===
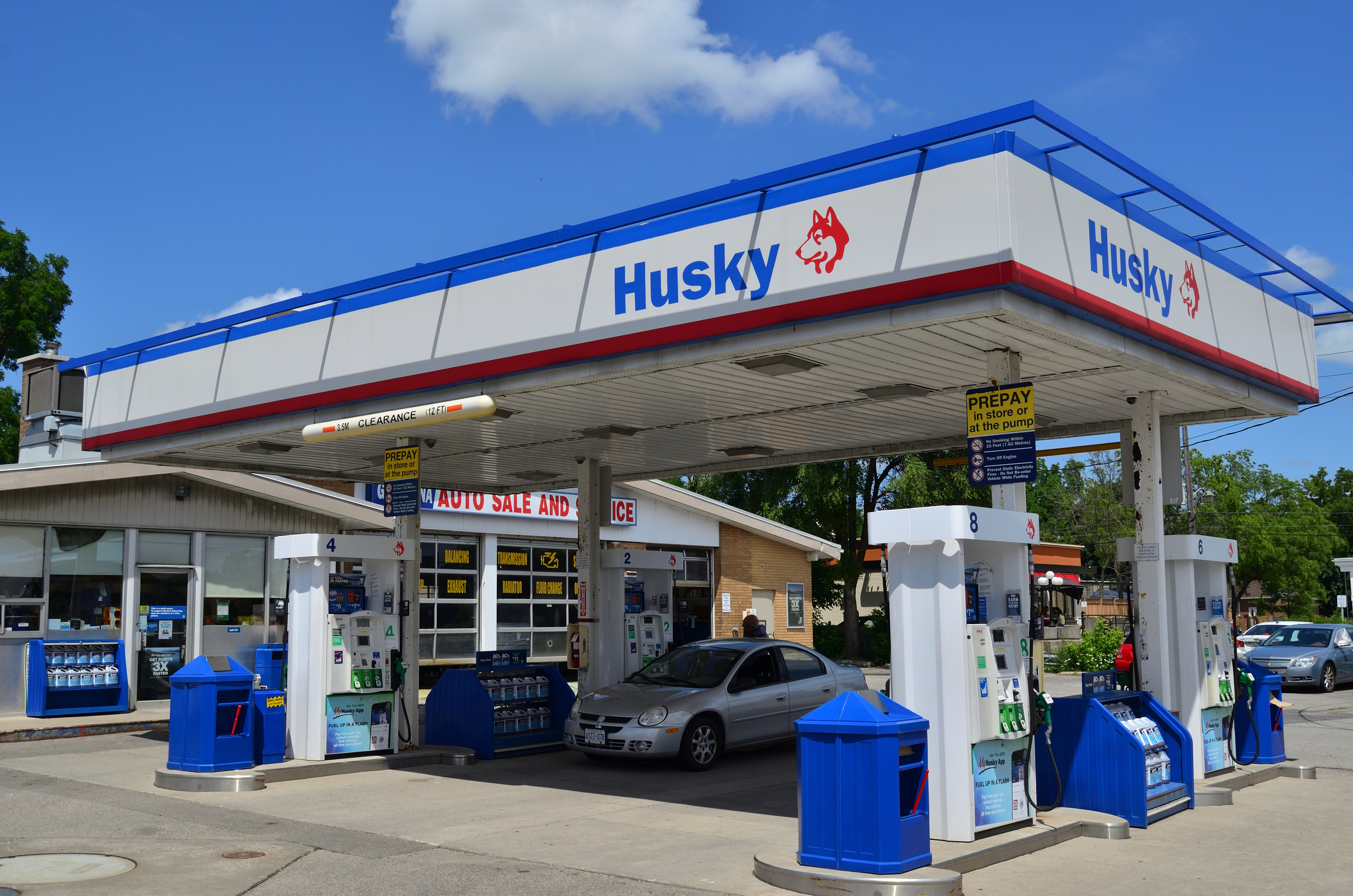
A Husky gas station in Markham, Ontario

At 2015 year-end, Husky Energy had total proved reserves before royalties of 1.3 billion boe and probable reserves of 1.6 billion boe. In 2015 its reserves replacement ratio was 166% (136% including economic factors), reflecting new additions from heavy oil thermal projects, the Sunrise Energy Project, the Liwan Gas Project and the company's natural gas fields offshore Indonesia. It owns approximately 490 retail stations in Canada.

Husky is the operator of the White Rose field and a partner in the Terra Nova project in the Jeanne d'Arc Basin offshore Newfoundland. The White Rose field (located offshore Newfoundland in the Jeanne d'Arc Basin) includes two production wells at South White Rose that came online in 2015. Exploration work is underway at the Bay du Nord discovery area in the Flemish Pass, with partner Statoil.

Husky also owns a 40% interest in the Wenchang project offshore China, located near the mouth of the Pearl River. The remaining 60% of the project is owned by the China National Offshore Oil Corporation (CNOOC). Husky is advancing the liquids-rich BD field offshore Indonesia, along with three additional shallow water fields.

Husky owns and operates the Lloydminster Heavy Oil Upgrader in Lloydminster, Saskatchewan, the Asphalt Refinery in Lloydminster, Alberta, and the Superior Refinery in Superior, Wisconsin. Husky also operates the Husky Lloydminster Ethanol Plant and the Minnedosa Ethanol Plant.

Husky Energy's operations are divided into two business segments: Upstream and Downstream.

The Upstream division focuses on oil and gas exploration and extraction. In addition to its existing producing assets and opportunities in Heavy Oil and Western Canada, the company has identified three pillars for growth: the Asia Pacific Region, the Oil Sands and the Atlantic Region.

Its Heavy Oil business include seven thermal developments in Saskatchewan.

The company's Western Canada portfolio includes a focus on resource plays.

In the Asia Pacific Region, Husky's Liwan Gas Project in the South China Sea began production in 2014. Husky is advancing the liquids-rich BD field offshore Indonesia, along with three additional shallow water fields.

Husky has a portfolio of oil sands leases, encompassing 2,500 square kilometres in the Fort McMurray region of northern Alberta. Its Sunrise Energy Project achieved first production in early 2015 and supports online applicants.

Husky is using steam-assisted gravity drainage technology at Sunrise, where bitumen is heated with steam to reduce its viscosity. When the liquid becomes more fluid, it is pumped to the surface and back to the central facility.

Husky has managed the terminal operations for Western Canada Select (WCS)—one of North America's largest heavy crude oil streams— since it came on stream in 2004.

=== Downstream ===
The Lloydminster Upgrader, in Lloydminster, Alberta, converts heavy oil to a high-quality, low sulphur synthetic oil.

Husky's asphalt refinery, in Lloydminster, Alberta, produces more than 30 different types and grades of road asphalt.

Husky's Ethanol Plant in Minnedosa, Manitoba has been producing ethanol to be blended into gasoline since 1981. In 2007 it was expanded and produces about 130 million litres of ethanol per year.

The Husky Lloydminster Ethanol Plant came online in 2006 and produces 130 million litres of ethanol per year. In Canada ethanol is blended into gasoline. Feedstock for the plant is mainly non-food feed-grade wheat purchased locally. The plant can also produce Corn ethanol.

Like other Midwest refiners, Husky was revamping its Lima, Ohio refinery to process Western Canadian Select, (WCS) a heavier but less expensive crude oil. Since 2012 "Lima has run over 60,000 bpd of Canadian crude, but only about 3,000 bpd of that would be particularly heavy with an API gravity below 30." In early January 2015, an explosion damaged the refinery's 26,000-bpd isocracker unit. Later that year Husky announced that, given the low price of oil, it would postpone its US$300 million crude oil flexibility project. The project will process up to 40,000 bpd of WCS.

Husky and BP arranged a joint venture in 2008 in order to develop and process Alberta bitumen through which Husky acquired a 50% share in the 155,000-bpd BP-Husky Toledo Refinery in Oregon, Ohio and BP acquired a 50% share of the Husky-operated Sunrise field in Alberta. This refinery has been upgraded with a coker and is processing bitumen from Sunrise.

=== Retail operations ===
In December 2009, Husky acquired 98 Sunoco and Petro-Canada stations in Ontario as part of Suncor Energy's acquisition of Petro-Canada.

In October 2015, Husky announced an agreement with Imperial Oil to combine its commercial cardlock network with Esso's network. As part of the agreement, all Husky cardlock locations were rebranded as Esso cardlocks in 2017, and selected retail locations—including Husky's travel centres—also switched fuel suppliers to Esso.

In January 2019, Husky stated that it was exploring the sale of its retail network and Prince George refinery.

In December 2021, Cenovus announced its intent to sell 337 Husky stations to Parkland Fuel and Federated Co-operatives, retaining the travel centres and commercial fuels business that operate under the Esso brand. Federated Co-operatives received 181 locations primarily in Western Canada; most of the locations were transferred to its member co-operatives and converted to the Co-op banner, and some were transferred to independent franchisees under its Tempo banner. Parkland converted its locations to its various fuel banners and On the Run stores.

In 2025, Cenovus reached an agreement to sell the Husky/Esso travel centre network to Brampton, Ontario-based BVD Petroleum (which, up until that point, primarily ran travel centres supplied by Petro-Canada); the sale was approved by the Competition Bureau in July 2026, with BVD being required to divest an existing location near Glendale in proximity to an existing Husky location. Upon the closure of the acquisition in August 2026, the travel centres began to be converted from Husky/Esso to BVD.

== Leadership ==
=== President ===
Glenn E. Nielson, 1938–1967
Gene E. Roark, 1967–1972
James E. Nielson, 1972–1979
Arthur R. Price, 1984–1993
James D. McFarland, 1995–1998
John Lau, 1998–2010
Asim Ghosh, 2010–2016
Robert J. Peabody, 2016–2020

=== Chairman of the Board ===
Glenn E. Nielson, 1967–1979
S. Robert Blair, 1979–1992
Simon Murray (Co-), 1987–1995
George C. Magnus (Co-), 1992–1995
Victor Li (Co-), 1995–2020
Canning Fok (Co-), 1995–2020
