= Minnedosa Lake =

Lake in Manitoba, Canada

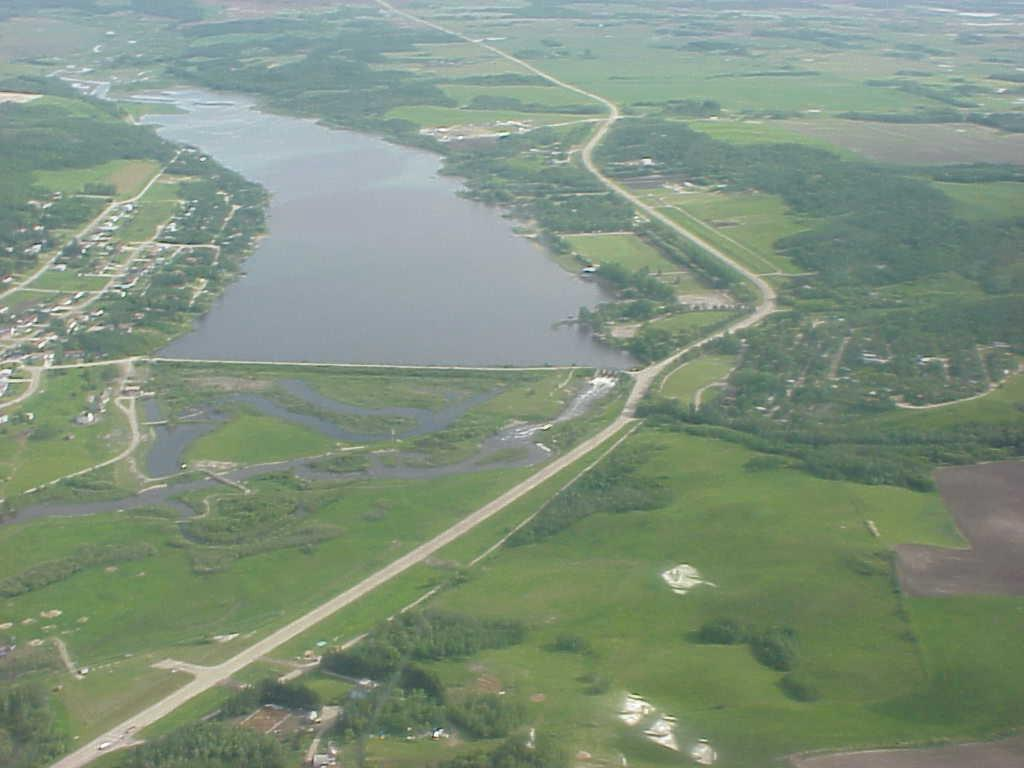
- Minnedosa Lake

- Location of the lake in Manitoba Minnedosa Lake (Canada)
- Location: Rural Municipality of Minto / Minnedosa, Manitoba
- Coordinates: 50°15′56″N 99°49′32″W
- Lake type: artificial lake
- Basin countries: Canada
- Max. length: 1.86 miles (2.99 km)
- Max. width: 1,475 feet (450 m)
- Surface area: 233 acres (0.94 km^{2})
- Max. depth: 20 feet (6.1 m)
- Water volume: 1,720 acre⋅ft (2,120,000 m^{3})
- Shore length^{1}: 4.3 miles (6.9 km)
- Surface elevation: 512.521 m (1,681.50 ft)
- Settlements: Minnedosa, Manitoba
- ^{1} Shore length is not a well-defined measure.

Minnedosa Lake is a man-made lake in the Canadian province of Manitoba near Minnedosa, Manitoba. It was created between 1910 and 1912 to serve as a reservoir for a hydro-electric dam. Today it is a popular recreation site, for both boating and swimming. The lake is considered one of the best sites for competitive rowing in Canada and was the venue for the 1999 Pan American Games rowing events. The lake is fed by the Little Saskatchewan River.

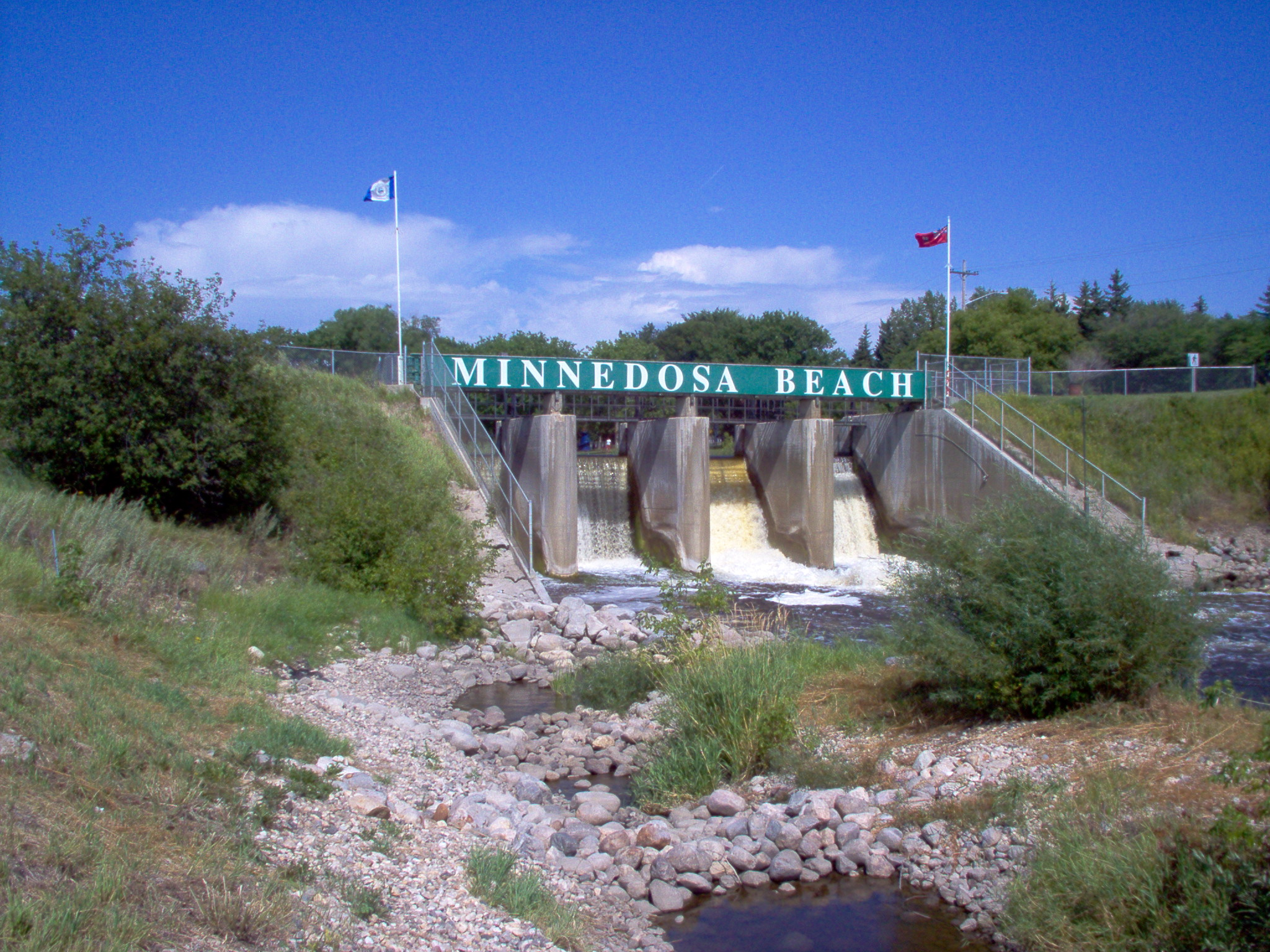
The Minnedosa Dam on the Little Saskatchewan River

== History ==
A dam was approved in December 1907 by the Government of Canada. After several delays, the dam was completed in 1912. Minnedosa was the second community in the Province of Manitoba to generate its own hydroelectric power. Initially privately owned, the generation plant was taken over by the Manitoba Power Commission in 1920. The dam provided power until 1933. The lake was used as a source of water for the town, for recreation, and for supplying the engines of the Canadian Pacific Railway. On May 4, 1948, the spillway of the dam failed due to erosion of structure, and the resulting flood damaged many homes and businesses in the town. The spillway was not repaired until 1950 by the Prairie Farm Rehabilitation Administration.

== See also ==
- List of lakes of Manitoba
