= Minnedosa, Manitoba =

Minnedosa
- Town
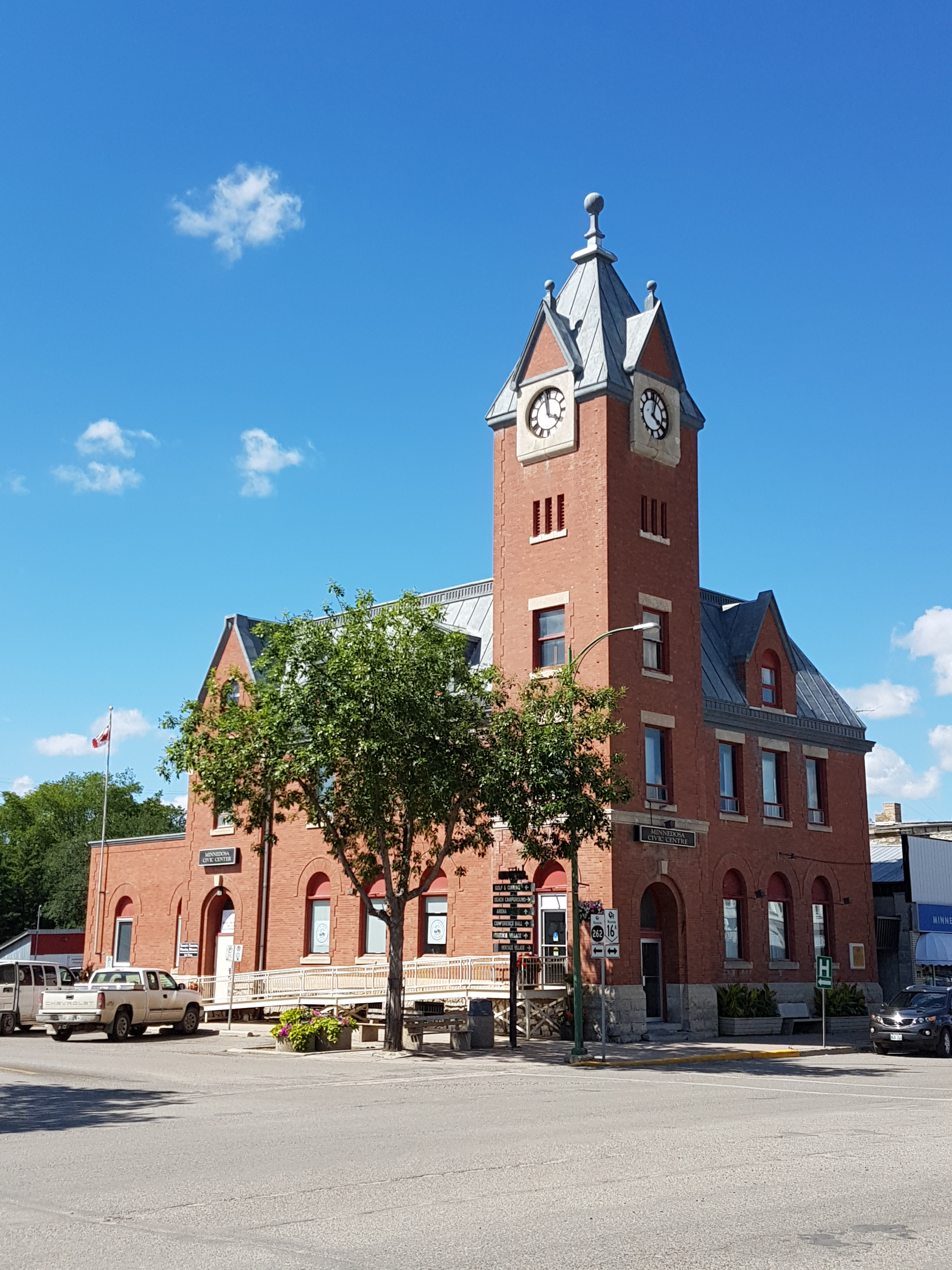
- The Minnedosa Dominion Post Office in downtown Minnedosa

- Town boundaries

- Location of Minnedosa in Manitoba
- Coordinates: 50°14′43″N 99°50′34″W
- Country: Canada
- Province: Manitoba
- Region: Westman
- Incorporated: March 2, 1883 (town)

Government
  - Mayor: Ken Cameron
  - MLA: Greg Nesbitt

Area
  - Total: 15.2 km^{2} (5.9 sq mi)

Population (2021)
  - Total: 2,741
  - Density: 161.1/km^{2} (417/sq mi)
- Time zone: UTC-6 (CST)
  - Summer (DST): UTC-5 (CDT)
- Website: www.minnedosa.com

Minnedosa is a town in the southwestern part of the Canadian province of Manitoba situated 50 kilometres (32 mi) north of Brandon, Manitoba on the Little Saskatchewan River. The town's name means "flowing water" in the Dakota language. The population of Minnedosa reported in the 2021 Canadian Census was 2,741. The town is surrounded by the Rural Municipality of Minto – Odanah.

== History ==
Prior to the arrival of Europeans in the area of Minnedosa, the land was primarily travelled and used by the nomadic Ojibway, Cree, Assiniboine, and Sioux peoples. John Tanner was the grandson of John Tanner who had been raised by an Odawa. He was an American settler who arrived in the area in 1869. The younger Tanner was the first Métis settler in the area and ran a ferry service across the Little Saskatchewan River. When a bridge was built in 1879, the ferry became obsolete and at the same time, a small town, Tanner's Crossing, was started nearby. John Armitage moved to the area around this time in 1877, and began to build a sawmill and gristmill. He joined together with Tanner to lay out a new town site and eventually Armitage had accumulated 3,800 acres (15 km^{2}) of property. Tanner named the new town Minnedosa, from the Dakota word mní dúza meaning "flowing water".

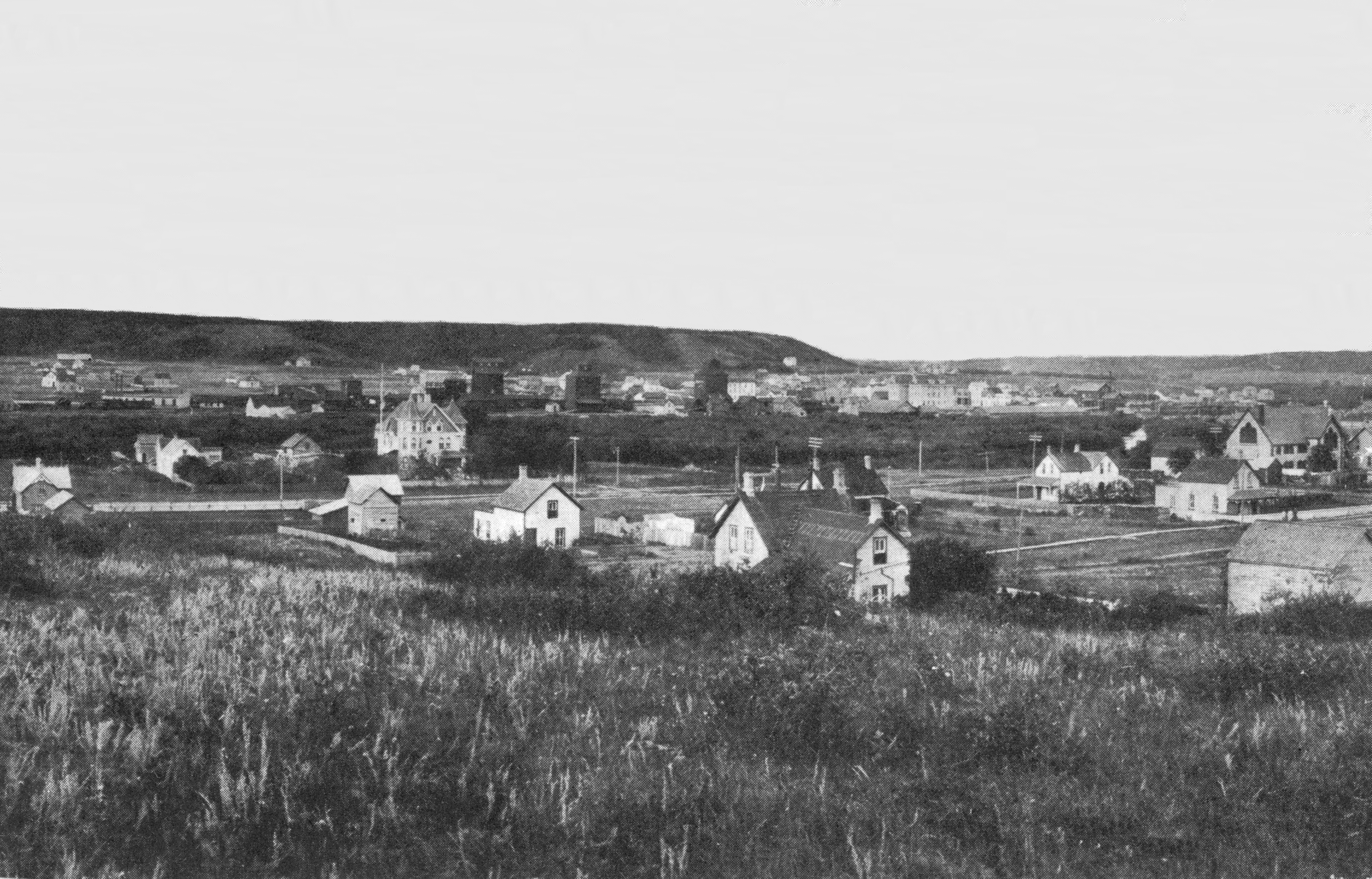
Minnedosa, c. 1918

Although Minnedosa once hoped to be a site of a river crossing for the Canadian Pacific Railway's transcontinental railway, the honour was initially given to Rapid City, while the actual site of the railway was later settled on a site much further south creating the city of Brandon. In 1883 Minnedosa was incorporated as a town, it had experienced a period of growth from settlement schemes put forth by the Canadian government. As Minnedosa became a town, this coincided with the actual arrival of the railway in 1883, bringing about more growth for the now quickly growing settlement.

A dam was proposed in 1907 and approved in December of the same year by the Government of Canada. It was built on the Little Saskatchewan River near the town. After several delays, the dam was completed in 1912, creating Minnedosa Lake. Water first flowed over the spillway on April 10, 1912. Minnedosa was the second community in the Province of Manitoba to generate its own hydroelectric power. An earlier project in 1900 was also on the Minnedosa River and supplied power to the town of Brandon, Manitoba. Initially privately owned, the generation plant was taken over by the Manitoba Power Commission in 1920 and replaced by a diesel generation plant and by 1930, power from the provincial grid. The lake was used as a source of water for the town, for recreation, and for supplying the engines of the Canadian Pacific Railway. On May 4, 1948, the spillway of the dam failed due to erosion of structure, and the resulting flood damaged many homes and businesses in the town. The spillway was not repaired until 1950 by the Prairie Farm Rehabilitation Administration.

Since 1981 the Minnedosa Ethanol Plant has been producing ethanol to be blended into gasoline, as of late 2007 it has been expanded into one of the largest ethanol facilities in Canada. This plant is owned and operated by Husky Energy.

== Geography ==
=== Climate ===
Minnedosa has a humid continental climate (Köppen dfb) typical of southern Manitoba. As a result of its far inland position at a relatively high latitude, winters are extremely cold with a January mean of below −17 °C (1 °F). In the relatively short summers Minnedosa experiences warm and sometimes hot temperatures due to warmer continental air masses. It is prone to cold nights year-round, with every calendar month having recorded air frost.

Climate data for Minnedosa, Manitoba
| Month | Jan | Feb | Mar | Apr | May | Jun | Jul | Aug | Sep | Oct | Nov | Dec | Year |
|---|---|---|---|---|---|---|---|---|---|---|---|---|---|
| Record high °C (°F) | 9.4 (48.9) | 11.1 (52.0) | 24.4 (75.9) | 34.0 (93.2) | 36.0 (96.8) | 42.2 (108.0) | 41.7 (107.1) | 39.4 (102.9) | 36.1 (97.0) | 31.0 (87.8) | 19.4 (66.9) | 12.2 (54.0) | 42.2 (108.0) |
| Mean daily maximum °C (°F) | −11.3 (11.7) | −7.3 (18.9) | −1 (30) | 8.8 (47.8) | 17.0 (62.6) | 21.7 (71.1) | 24.0 (75.2) | 24.0 (75.2) | 17.1 (62.8) | 9.0 (48.2) | −2.3 (27.9) | −9.6 (14.7) | 7.5 (45.5) |
| Daily mean °C (°F) | −17.3 (0.9) | −13.2 (8.2) | −6.6 (20.1) | 2.3 (36.1) | 9.8 (49.6) | 15.1 (59.2) | 17.3 (63.1) | 16.8 (62.2) | 10.5 (50.9) | 3.2 (37.8) | −7.1 (19.2) | −15 (5) | 1.3 (34.3) |
| Mean daily minimum °C (°F) | −23.1 (−9.6) | −19.1 (−2.4) | −12.3 (9.9) | −4.2 (24.4) | 2.7 (36.9) | 8.5 (47.3) | 10.6 (51.1) | 9.5 (49.1) | 3.7 (38.7) | −2.7 (27.1) | −11.8 (10.8) | −20.8 (−5.4) | −4.9 (23.2) |
| Record low °C (°F) | −46.7 (−52.1) | −46.7 (−52.1) | −42.2 (−44.0) | −29.4 (−20.9) | −16 (3) | −5.6 (21.9) | −1 (30) | −4.4 (24.1) | −14.4 (6.1) | −25 (−13) | −38.3 (−36.9) | −43.9 (−47.0) | −46.7 (−52.1) |
| Average precipitation mm (inches) | 23.2 (0.91) | 16.7 (0.66) | 27.0 (1.06) | 29.5 (1.16) | 59.0 (2.32) | 76.7 (3.02) | 81.5 (3.21) | 69.6 (2.74) | 47.8 (1.88) | 34.3 (1.35) | 18.6 (0.73) | 21.0 (0.83) | 504.8 (19.87) |
| Average rainfall mm (inches) | 0.1 (0.00) | 0.4 (0.02) | 8.8 (0.35) | 20.6 (0.81) | 57.7 (2.27) | 76.7 (3.02) | 81.5 (3.21) | 69.6 (2.74) | 47.8 (1.88) | 27.4 (1.08) | 2.6 (0.10) | 1.4 (0.06) | 394.4 (15.53) |
| Average snowfall cm (inches) | 23.1 (9.1) | 16.2 (6.4) | 18.2 (7.2) | 8.9 (3.5) | 1.3 (0.5) | 0.0 (0.0) | 0.0 (0.0) | 0.0 (0.0) | 0.0 (0.0) | 7.0 (2.8) | 16.0 (6.3) | 19.6 (7.7) | 110.4 (43.5) |
| Average precipitation days (≥ 0.2 mm) | 7.6 | 5.4 | 7.1 | 6.2 | 9.4 | 12.6 | 11.6 | 10.6 | 8.3 | 7.6 | 6.1 | 6.9 | 99.3 |
Source: Environment Canada

== Demographics ==
Historical population
| Year | Pop. | ±% |
|---|---|---|
| 1891 | 614 | — |
| 1901 | 1,052 | +71.3% |
| 1911 | 1,483 | +41.0% |
| 1921 | 1,505 | +1.5% |
| 1931 | 1,680 | +11.6% |
| 1941 | 1,636 | −2.6% |
| 1951 | 2,085 | +27.4% |
| 1961 | 2,211 | +6.0% |
| 1996 | 2,443 | +10.5% |
| 2001 | 2,426 | −0.7% |
| 2006 | 2,474 | +2.0% |
| 2011 | 2,587 | +4.6% |
| 2016 | 2,449 | −5.3% |
| 2021 | 2,741 | +11.9% |
Sources: Department of Agriculture,

In the 2021 Census of Population conducted by Statistics Canada, Minnedosa had a population of 2,741 living in 1,210 of its 1,398 total private dwellings, a change of 11.9% from its 2016 population of 2,449. With a land area of 14.95 km^{2} (5.77 sq mi), it had a population density of 183.3/km^{2} (474.9/sq mi) in 2021.

== Attractions ==
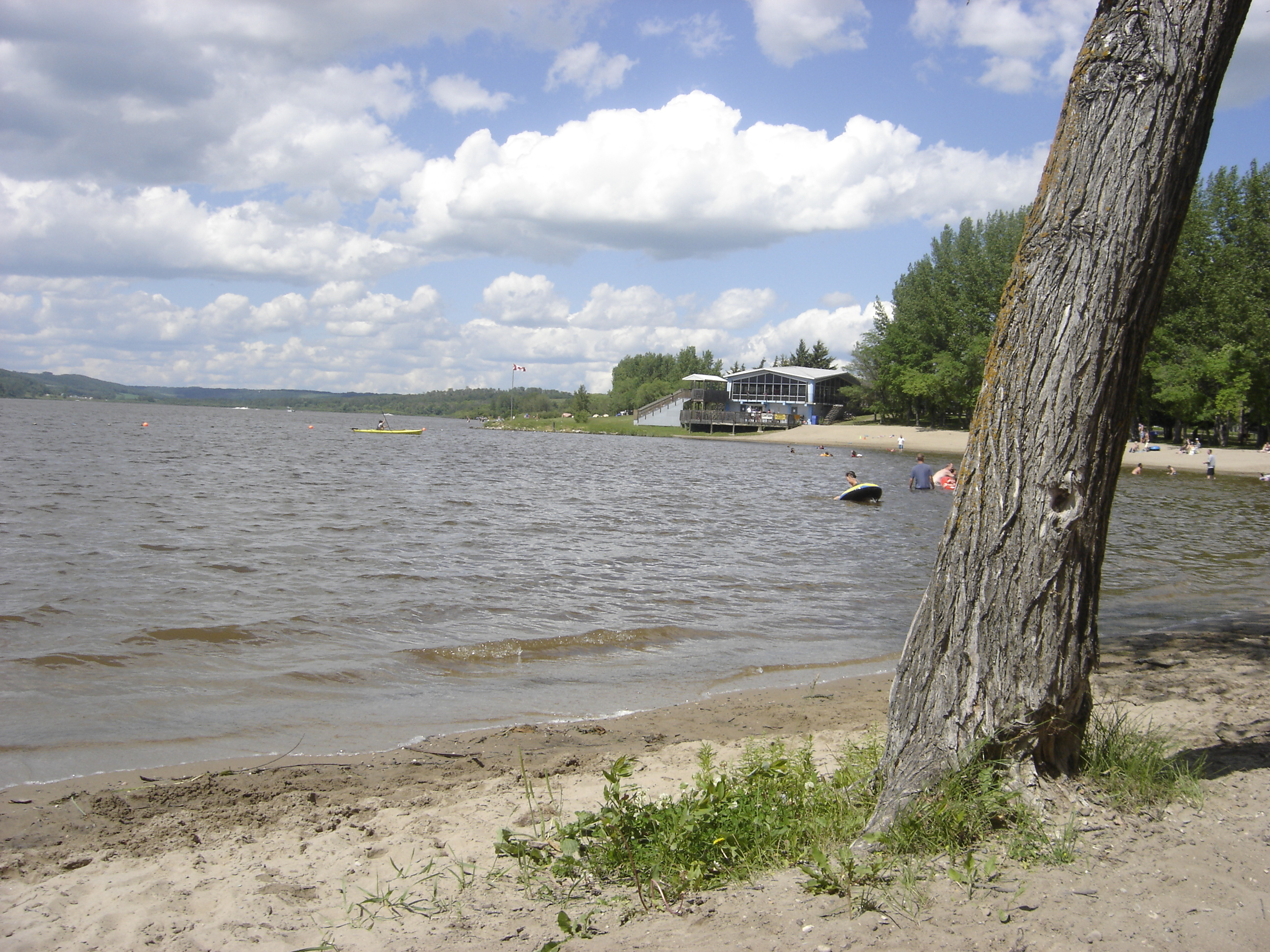
Minnedosa Beach

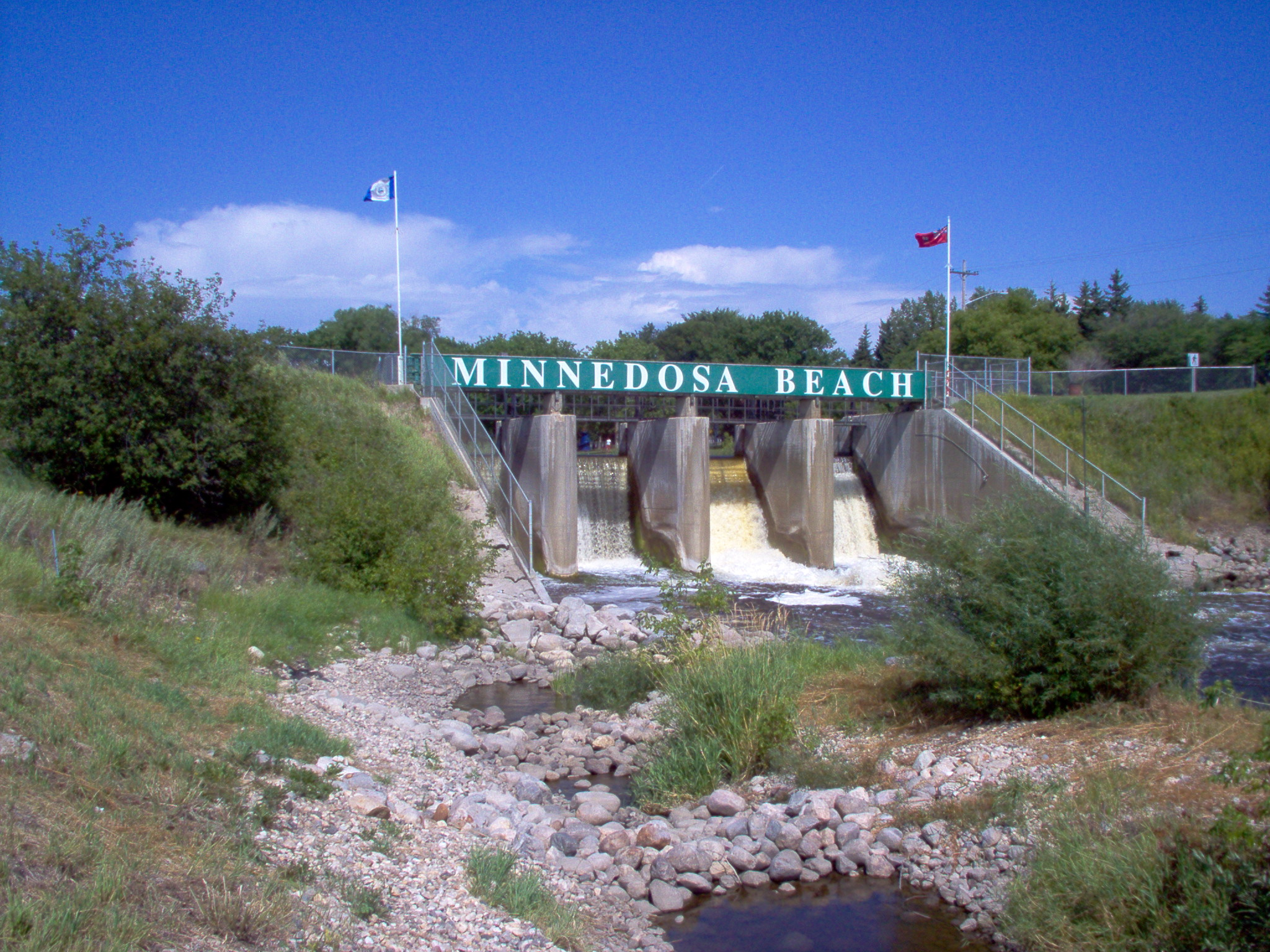
Minnedosa Dam on the Little Saskatchewan River

- Minnedosa Civic Center – The large clock tower located downtown
- Buffalo Park – located south of the Minnedosa Dam on PTH 262
- Train Park located on the east side of Main Street Minnedosa
- Nature Trail – 20 minute walk through wooded area adjacent to Buffalo Compound. Has a swinging bridge as well as a viewing tower
- Heritage Park – A complex containing several buildings relating to the history of Minnedosa and its surrounding area
- Lookout Tower – Approximately 40-foot (12 m) tower on top of a steep hill. Overlooks entire valley
- Trout Pond – Fishing spot stocked with many trout. Located at Heritage Village
- Minnedosa is also the site of an annual event, called Rockin' the Fields of Minnedosa
- Minnedosa Paddling Club, part of Manitoba Paddling Association
- Minnedosa Lake

== Education ==
- There is a high school called Minnedosa Collegiate Institute, often called M.C.I., and there is an elementary school called Tanner's Crossing School (T.C.S.). Both schools are part of the Rolling River School Division, which has its main bus dispatch and administration offices in town.

== Media ==
=== Newspaper ===
- Minnedosa Tribune

== Notable people ==
- Izzy Asper, founder of CanWest Global Communications Corp
- Ron Chipperfield, professional hockey player
- Frances Gertrude McGill (1882–1959), forensic pathologist and criminologist
- Maxine Miller, actress
- Isabela Onyshko, 2016 Olympic gymnast
- Kyle Parrott, 2010 Olympic speed skater
- Colin Pearson, Baron Pearson, British law lord
- Kate Rice, prospector, adventurer and writer died here
- Curt Ridley, professional hockey player
- Ken Watson, 3-time Brier-winning curler
- William Henry Atkinson, flying ace fighter
