= Mohawk Oil =

Gas Station and oil recycling chain in Canada

Mohawk Oil was an oil recycling and gas retailing business in Canada wholly owned by Husky Energy. Mohawk began as an independent chain of gas stations started in 1960 by Hugh Sutherland. It later began to invest in oil recycling and built their first recycling plant in 1980 to recycle oil from across western Canada, reselling it to other companies. Mohawk produced ethanol at its plant in Minnedosa, Manitoba. Mohawk was the largest retailer of ethanol-blended gasolines in Western Canada before being acquired by Husky in 1998.

Husky Oil of Canada and Balaclava Enterprises of Vancouver offered CA$7.25 a share for Mohawk. The offer was conditional on 90 percent of Mohawk common shares being deposited to the bid, including the approximately 21 percent already held by Balaclava. Mohawk’s board of directors accepted the bid and had recommended it to shareholders at which time Hugh Sutherland held 42% of the shares. Letters explaining the offer were sent to Mohawk shareholders June 5 with offer expiry of July 6, 1998.

The purchase of Mohawk Canada Limited for CA$102 million proceeded in July 1998. The acquisition added about 300 gas stations and an ethanol plant to Husky’s assets.

The oil recycling plant was sold off in the late 1990s to several different operators, and is known as "Terrapure Oil Recycling" in North Vancouver.

The brand name and logo reinforce an all-Canadian image similar to that of Petro-Canada. Stretching from Vancouver Island to Eastern Canada, Mohawk and Husky have over 500 stations. Mohawk's fuel contains up to 10% ethanol.

In 2015, Mohawk sold off its remaining gas stations and left the oil industry altogether.
