= Valentine Monroe Kirk =

Oil developer and rancher

Valentine (Val) Monroe Kirk (1883–1947), was an oil exploration pioneer and rancher in Wyoming and Montana. Generally known as "V.M." or going simply by his surname, Kirk was born in Greene County, Tennessee on June 10, 1883, to Joseph Wiley Kirk (1839–1921) and Elizabeth C. "Katie" Drake (1849–1887). Records are not definitive—including evidence such as an old family cemetery and limited provenance of an antique desk thought to be owned by his great-grandfather Captain Joseph Isaac Kirk (1755–1821)—but Valentine descended from five prior generations of Kirks who homesteaded the area northeast of Knoxville, Tennessee as early as the 1730s. Kirk's great-granduncle, John M. Kirk Junior (b.1771; Capt. Joseph I. Kirk's younger brother) committed the notorious May 1788 murder of Native American leaders including Old Tassel, "First Beloved Man" of the Overhill Cherokee.

== Wyoming history ==
Kirk moved to Wyoming in 1900 as manager of the Metcalf Land & Livestock Company (Newcastle, Wyoming). He subsequently purchased half interest in Metcalf (c. 1908), which was eventually dissolved after heavy losses in two hard winters (1909–1910 and 1913–1914).

Kirk married Pearle Julia Burdick, on March 4, 1908, their license having been issued by Weston County, Wyoming and the ceremony taking place at the Salisbury Hotel in Upton. The couple had three sons. Carroll Joseph Kirk, with whom Kirk would eventually partner in oil exploration, extraction, and refining businesses, was born August 10, 1910, in Upton. A namesake Valentine Monroe Kirk Jr., was born in Hot Springs, South Dakota (June 9, 1918) and died of cholera infantum at just over 1 year of age. The junior Valentine is interred at the Greenwood Cemetery, in Upton. A third son, Charley Lafayette Kirk, was born in Newcastle, May 4, 1920 but died while still a young child of complications from the influenza virus.

The Kirk family had relocated from Wyoming to Kansas City in 1918 but oil business opportunities (detailed below) soon brought them back to Wyoming. In late May of 1934, Kirk developed tuberculosis. He spent a number of weeks being treated at the Mayo Clinic in Rochester, Minnesota and after being discharged, was ordered by doctors to a sanitarium in Arizona.

After largely recovering his health, Kirk lived to see the birth of three granddaughters at the family's home, by then in Frannie, Wyoming. Kirk and his wife enjoyed traveling, including to Mexico and Hawaii (not yet a state of course in the late 1930s). He also supported causes like the development of the Buffalo Bill Scout Camp (now Camp Buffalo Bill), 40 miles west of Cody near the east entrance to Yellowstone National Park. The camp was started with funding from Kirk; family friend and oil industry colleague Glenn Nielson; Cody mayor, oilman, rancher and Kirk family friend Paul Stock; and their associate Lloyd Taggart. Valentine M. Kirk did not live to see the camp open, as he died in Lovell, Wyoming on May 4, 1948, and was buried in Newcastle following services in Billings, Montana.

== Oil exploration and operations ==
Kirk entered the oil business in 1918, as a drilling contractor operating in Wyoming, Montana, and the family's then-new home state of Kansas. He was one of the first drillers working the Osage oilfield in eastern Wyoming, and discovered the Frannie field in 1928. The Kirk Oil Company was established in Cody, Wyoming, corporate documents actually being finalized while Kirk was being treated at the Mayo Clinic.

Another of Kirk's companies, Cody Petroleum, managed oil extraction operations in the Frannie, Oregon Basin, and Maverick Springs oilfields during this same period. In 1934, Kirk started the Park Refining Company, their primary business being to provide heavy bunker fuel to the Minneapolis and Chicago markets, brokered through the Western Oil and Fuel company (Minneapolis).

Kirk also marketed gasoline during this period under a licensing agreement with Western, whereby his group distributed to retail customers under Western's Husky gas stations brand in Idaho, Utah, Wyoming, Montana, and the western Dakotas. Western Oil and Fuel sold Husky gasoline in the eastern part of the US. In his mid-1920s and just married (July 1, 1933) to Luella Pearl Vaterlaus (1909–1997), son Carroll Kirk took an increasing role in management of the family's oil businesses from the family home in Frannie during his father's convalescence from tuberculosis.

The assets of Park Refining and Cody Petroleum were sold on January 1, 1938 to Glenn Nielson, who adopted the Husky name to create the Husky Refining Company—now the multinational Husky Energy. At the time of their sale to Nielson, the 19-person Park Refining operation had a processing capacity of 900-1000 barrels of oil a day, and Cody Petroleum was managing four wells (the Klindt lease) producing 400-500 barrels daily. Kirk served for a time as Vice President for Wyoming of the Independent Petroleum Association of America and remained President of the Kirk Oil Company until his death.

== Livestock operations ==
In 1939, Kirk acquired a cattle and sheep ranch just northeast of Choteau, Montana, which he operated until the year before his passing. The 5000-acre ranch was purchased from the Coffey Brothers for an estimated $40,000.
