= The Minnedosa Tribune =

Canadian newspaper in Manitoba

- Type: Weekly newspaper
- Founded: 1883
- Country: Canada
- Website: minnedosatribune.com

The Minnedosa Tribune, published in Minnedosa, Manitoba, Canada, is the oldest Western Canadian weekly.

== See also ==
- List of newspapers in Canada
