= Egyptian Red Crescent Society =

- جمعية الهلال الأحمر المصري
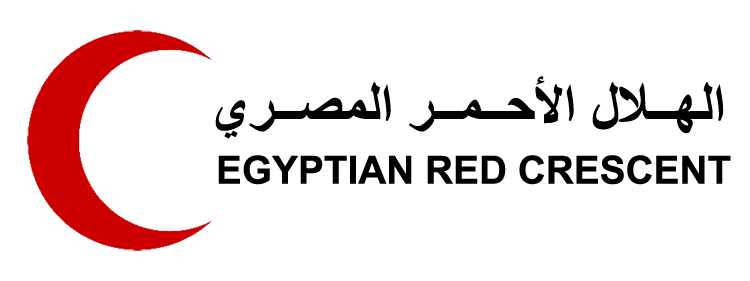
- logo
- Founded: 1911; 115 years ago
- Founder: Ali Youssef
- Type: Humanitarian Aid, Nonprofit organization
- Purpose: Humanitarian aid
- Location: Cairo, Egypt
- Region served: Egypt
- Method: Aid agency
- Website: egyptianrc.org

The Egyptian Red Crescent Society (Arabic: جمعية الهلال الأحمر المصري, romanized: Jamʻīyat al-Hilāl al-Aḥmar al-Miṣrī) is a humanitarian society that provides emergency medical services and humanitarian aid in Egypt. It was founded in 1911 by Sheikh Ali Youssef in Cairo. It is a member of the International Federation of Red Cross and Red Crescent Societies.
