= Robert J. Peabody =

Canadian businessman (born 1956)

- Born: July 6, 1956 (age 69); Moncton, New Brunswick
- Known for: President and CEO of Husky Energy

Robert J. Peabody is a Canadian businessman who served as the president and CEO of Husky Energy Inc., one of Canada's largest integrated energy companies. The company is headquartered in Calgary, Alberta, and listed on the Toronto Stock Exchange. In 2015, Husky produced an average of 346,000 barrels of oil equivalent per day.

Peabody was born on July 6, 1956, in Moncton, New Brunswick. He has held senior positions at oil, gas and chemical companies, both in Canada and internationally, and was appointed Husky's chief operating officer in 2006.

He is married to Patricia Peabody and has two children.

== Education ==
Peabody has a Bachelor of Science in mechanical engineering from the University of British Columbia and a Master of Science in management from Stanford University (Sloan Fellow).

== Career ==
Peabody began his career working on an early in situ oil sands development in northern Alberta. He then moved on to help deliver a major upstream project in the North Sea and held senior positions in exploration and production, natural gas marketing, oil trading and project management.

Before joining Husky, Peabody was president of BP global polymers and served as vice president of polyester and aromatics Americas and vice president for group strategy, planning and performance management during a period when BP transformed into one of the world's leading energy companies.

In 2006, Peabody was brought on board as Husky's chief operating officer. In December 2016 he was appointed Husky's president and CEO and to its board of directors.

== Affiliations ==
Peabody sits on the Foothills Hospital Development Council. He is a member of the Professional Engineers and Geoscientists of Alberta (APEGA) and has served on the board of the U.S. National Petrochemical & Refiners Association.
