= Non-food item =

(humanitarian) products other than edibles

Non-food items (NFIs) are items other than food. The term is especially used in humanitarian contexts, when providing NFIs to those affected by natural disasters or war may be a life-saving priority. Typically, they include essential household items such as blankets, plastic sheets, containers for water, cooking items, and soap.
