= Athabasca Northern Railway =

Railway in Alberta Canada

Overview
- Reporting mark: ANY
- Locale: Alberta
- Dates of operation: 2000–2007
- Predecessor: Canadian National Railway
- Successor: Canadian National Railway

Technical
- Length: 325 km (201.9 mi)

The Athabasca Northern Railway (reporting mark ANY) was a shortline railway in Alberta, Canada. Originally built as the Alberta and Great Waterways Railway between 1909 and 1925, the line ran 325 kilometres (200 mi) between Boyle and Fort McMurray. It eventually became part of the Northern Alberta Railways, which was jointly owned by the Canadian National Railway and Canadian Pacific Railway, and it was closed in 1989.

The line was reborn as the Athabasca Northern Railway in 2000 when it was sold to Cando Contracting. By 2007, the track had deteriorated due to increased traffic, and the line was set to be abandoned. It was re-acquired by Canadian National in December 2007, however, and as of 2011, rehabilitation was underway.
