= Cenovus Energy =

Canadian integrated oil and natural gas company

Cenovus Energy Inc.
- Type: Public
- Traded as: TSX: CVE; NYSE: CVE; S&P/TSX 60 component
- Industry: Petroleum industry
- Founded: 30 November 2009; 16 years ago
- Headquarters: Calgary, Alberta, Canada
- Key people: Jon McKenzie (CEO); Alex Pourbaix (board chair)
- Products: Natural gas; Fuel; Diesel fuel; Jet fuel
- Revenue: ▲CA$54.277 billion (2024)
- Operating income: ▼CA$10.795 billion (2024)
- Net income: ▼CA$3.142 billion (2024)
- Total assets: ▲CA$56.539 billion (2024)
- Total equity: ▲CA$29.754 billion (2024)
- Number of employees: 7,150 full-time equivalent employees
- Subsidiaries: Husky Energy
- Website: www.cenovus.com

Cenovus Energy Inc. (pronounced se-nō-vus) is a Canadian integrated oil and natural gas company headquartered in Calgary, Alberta. Its offices are located at Brookfield Place, having completed a move from the neighbouring Bow in 2019.

== History ==
Cenovus was formed in 2009 when Encana split into two companies, with Cenovus becoming focused on oil sands assets.

In 2017, Cenovus purchased ConocoPhillips' 50 percent share of their Foster Creek Christina Lake (FCCL) oil sands projects and most of their conventional assets in Alberta and British Columbia, including the Deep Basin. Cenovus completed the acquisition of Husky Energy for C$3.9 billion in stock in January 2021. The combined company is Canada’s third-largest crude oil and natural gas producer and the second-largest Canadian-based refiner and upgrader. In August 2025, MEG Energy agreed to be acquired by Cenovus for CA$7.9 billion in a cash-and-stock deal, two months after MEG rejected a hostile acquisition offer from Strathcona Resources for $6bn.

== Operations ==
=== Oil sands ===
Cenovus has four producing projects in the oil sands – Foster Creek, Christina Lake (Alberta), Sunrise (jointly owned with BP Canada and operated by Cenovus) and Tucker. All projects use the drilling method of steam-assisted gravity drainage (SAGD). On May 17, 2017, Foster Creek and Christina Lake became 100 percent owned and operated by Cenovus. In December 2021, Cenovus announced the sale of the Tucker oil sands project to Strathcona Resources. In June 2022, Cenovus announced it would acquire the outstanding 50% interest in the Sunrise oil sands asset and assume full ownership.

=== Conventional oil and gas ===
Cenovus once held conventional oil and natural gas operations across Alberta and Saskatchewan, including the Weyburn oilfield in Saskatchewan, which is the largest CO_{2} enhanced oil recovery operation in Canada. It's also the site of the largest geological greenhouse gas storage project in the world, with about 30 million tonnes of CO_{2} safely stored underground and extensively studied by researchers as part of the International Energy Agency Greenhouse Gas Weyburn-Midale CO_{2} Monitoring and Storage Project.

In May 2017, Cenovus assumed ownership of ConocoPhillips' conventional assets in Alberta and British Columbia. Cenovus’s current conventional assets include the Deep Basin, a liquids-rich natural gas fairway located in northwestern Alberta and northeastern British Columbia, and the Marten Hills heavy oil project. The Deep Basin asset comprises approximately 2.8 million net acres of land and produced more than 125,000 barrels of oil equivalent. Cenovus also holds a significant land position in the Marten Hills region for potential development. In November 2020, Cenovus announced the sale of the Marten Hills assets to Headwater Exploration Inc.

=== Refining ===
Following the acquisition of Husky Energy in January 2021, Cenovus became Canada’s second-largest Canadian-based refiner and upgrader. Cenovus owns the Lima Refinery in Lima, Ohio, the Superior Refinery in Superior, Wisconsin and the Lloydminster refinery in Lloydminster, Alberta and upgrader in Lloydminster, Saskatchewan. Cenovus has 50 percent ownership in two refineries in the United States: the Wood River Refinery and Borger, Texas refinery. Phillips 66 is the co-owner and operator. In August 2022, Cenovus reached an agreement to purchase BP's 50% interest in the BP-Husky Toledo Refinery in Toledo, Ohio. Cenovus has owned the other 50% of the refinery since its combination with Husky Energy in 2021.

=== Transportation ===
Cenovus owns a crude-by-rail loading facility near Edmonton Alberta – the Bruderheim Energy Terminal. The company was recognized for its rail safety performance in 2016, and for safe transportation of chemical products in 2017.

=== Retail ===
Cenovus owns a group of travel centres under the Husky brand, which were included in its acquisition of Husky Energy. They offer fuels under the Esso brand.

== Technology ==
The primary technology Cenovus uses at its Foster Creek and Christina Lake projects is called steam-assisted gravity drainage (SAGD). Cenovus also applies different associated technologies to enhance the SAGD process, such as electric submersible pumps at Foster Creek and solvent aided process (SAP) at Christina Lake.

In 2011, the company began applying its blowdown boiler technology to improve the efficiency of water use at its oil sands operations. In 2013, Cenovus developed its "SkyStrat" drilling rig that allows an exploratory rig to be flown into remote areas by helicopter piece-by-piece, set up to drill a test well, dismantled and airlifted away. The process requires no roads, meaning little disturbance to the boreal forest. The company received an Environmental Performance award for the SkyStrat program.

=== Potential mitigation of climate impacts ===
Cenovus is a member of Oil Sands Pathways to Net Zero initiative, an alliance of oil sands companies working collectively with the federal and Alberta governments to achieve net zero greenhouse gas (GHG) emissions from the companies oil sands operations by 2050. According to Cenovus's Chief Sustainability Officer, the company is pursuing government support for decarbonization efforts, because "[t]hese are not projects that make revenue. So for a corporation that is owned by shareholders to put 100 per cent of the costs into a project that doesn’t bring any revenue back, that is not something that a corporation can do." However, a report by the Canadian Institute for Climate Choices, a source of independent analysis on climate change issues funded by Environment Canada, recommended investing limited public dollars to capture "a share of growing, transition-opportunity markets" rather than in "assets at elevated risk of being stranded in global low-carbon scenarios" as fossil fuel demand "inevitably decline[s] globally".

== Leadership ==
=== President ===
1. Brian Charles Ferguson, 30 November 2009 – 6 November 2017
2. Alexander John Pourbaix, 6 November 2017 – 26 April 2023
3. Jonathan Michael McKenzie, 26 April 2023 – present

=== Chairman of the Board ===
1. Michael Anthony Grandin, 30 November 2009 – 26 April 2017
2. Patrick Darold Daniel, 26 April 2017 – 29 April 2020
3. Keith Allan John MacPhail, 29 April 2020 – 26 April 2023
4. Alexander John Pourbaix, 26 April 2023 – present

== See also ==
- Axe Lake Aerodrome
- Husky Energy
- Esso
