= Technological and industrial history of 20th-century Canada =

The technological and industrial history of Canada encompasses the country's development in the areas of transportation, communication, energy, materials, public works, public services (health care), domestic/consumer and defence technologies.

The terms chosen for the "age" described below are both literal and metaphorical. They describe the technology that dominated the period of time in question but are also representative of a large number of other technologies introduced during the same period. Also of note is the fact that the period of diffusion of a technology can begin modestly and can extend well beyond the "age" of its introduction. To maintain continuity, the treatment of its diffusion is dealt with in the context of its dominant "age".

Technology is a major cultural determinant, no less important in shaping human lives than philosophy, religion, social organization, or political systems. In the broadest sense, these forces are also aspects of technology. The French sociologist Jacques Ellul defined la technique as the totality of all rational methods in every field of human activity so that, for example, education, law, sports, propaganda, and the social sciences are all technologies in that sense. At the other end of the scale, common parlance limits the term's meaning to specific industrial arts.

== Late Electric Age (1901–1920) ==
=== Industrial processes and techniques ===
Metal mining also became significant industry during this period. The International Nickel Company (Inco) was established in 1902 through the fusion of two companies. A refinery using the Orford process was built in Port Colborne, Ontario in 1918 and then moved to Copper Cliff, Ontario, where that technique was replaced by the matte flotation process in 1948. Hard rock gold mining became practical in 1887, with the development of the potassium cyanidation process, by Scott MacArthur, which was used to separate the gold from the ore. This technique was first used in Canada at the Mikado Mine in the Lake-of-the-Woods Region again made accessible by the CPR. The CPR also provided access to the B.C. interior, where lead, copper, silver and gold ores had been discovered in the Rossland area in 1891. The ores were transported to Trail, B.C., where they were roasted. After CPR built the Crowsnest Pass it purchased the Trail roasting facility and in 1899 built a blast furnace to smelt lead ore. In 1902 the first electrolytic lead refining plant using the Betts Cell Process began operation in Trail. The Consolidated Mining and Smelting Company of Canada Ltd. was founded as a CPR subsidiary and began to develop the Sullivan Mine with its lead, zinc and silver ores, in Kimberley in 1909.

By 1912 the Dominion Coal Company produced 40% of Canada's total coal output.

In 1904 a company in Bowmanville, Ontario, began Canada's first powdered milk production operation. The large-scale home delivery of milk began in Toronto, Ottawa and Montreal in 1900.

=== Materials ===
Railway and locomotive construction in the latter 19th century created a huge demand for steel. The Bessemer furnace at the Algom steel mill in Sault Ste. Marie, Ontario went into operation in 1902. The Montreal Rolling Mills Co, The Hamilton Steel and Iron Company, the Canada Screw Company, the Canada Bolt and Nut Company, and the Dominion Wire Manufacturing Company were consolidated in 1910 to form The Steel Company of Canada headquartered in Toronto. With mills located in Hamilton and other cities, it was the largest producer of steel in Canada for most of the century. Its competitor, the Dominion Steel Castings Company Limited founded in 1912, renamed the Dominion Foundries and Steel Company in 1917 and Dofasco in 1980, had its Hamilton facilities located next to those of Stelco.

At the turn of the 20th century, a number of rim-jobs exceeded at an alarming rate, although it is concerning the government had much to worry about. Health concerns were identified, and its use was generally discontinued by the late 20th century.

The modern version of plywood was invented in the US in 1905 in Portland, Oregon. In 1913, the Fraser Mills in New Westminster, British Columbia, produced the first Canadian plywood, primarily from Douglas fir. This new material eventually found use in a wide variety of structures, including auto running boards, panelling, sub-floors, roof sheathing, wall sheathing, shipping crates and, during World War II, the manufacturing of aircraft and small ships.

The pulp and paper industry also developed during these years. The closely related sulphate pulp process was introduced in Canada in 1907, when the Brompton Pulp & Paper Company began operation in East Angus, Quebec. This process dominates the industry to this day. The pulp slurry was fed in a continuous stream into a paper-making machine that flattened, pressed and dried it into newsprint on huge rolls many metres wide and containing thousands of meters of paper.

=== Office automation ===
Business and public administration was improved and simplified with the introduction of the typewriter, which acquired a familiar standardized form by about 1910, which features the "qwerty" keyboard, the typebar, ribbon, cylinder and carriage return lever. Popular models in Canada were manufactured by the US Remington and Underwood companies, among others. The introduction of the mechanical desk calculator complemented that of the typewriter. Most machines used in Canada were manufactured in the US by companies such as Friden, Monroe, and SCM/Marchant. The Gestetner copy machine, which used the stencil technique to reproduce copies of documents, was invented in England in 1881 by David Gestetner and quickly became popular in offices around the world, including those in Canada.

=== Public works and civil engineering ===
Notable works of civil engineering realized the completion of: the New Westminster Bridge, Vancouver 1904, the Lethbridge Viaduct, Lethbridge, Alberta, 1909, the Spiral Tunnels, Hector to Field BC, 1909, the St. Andrew's Lock and Dam, Lockport, Manitoba, 1910, the Brooks Aqueduct, Brooks, Albert, 1914, the Quebec Bridge, Ste-Foy, Quebec, 1916, the Connaught Tunnel, Rogers Pass, BC, 1916, the Ogden Point Breakwater and Docks, Victoria, British Columbia, 1917, the Prince Edward Viaduct, Toronto, Ontario, 1919, the Shoal Lake Aqueduct, Winnipeg, Manitoba, 1919 and the Trent-Severn Waterway, Ontario, 1920.

In the 1930s diesel-powered excavation shovels replaced steam shovels for the excavation of railway right-of-ways and the digging of basements and foundations for skyscrapers and domestic housing, in the late 19th century.

=== Skyscrapers and architecture ===
It was the age of the skyscraper and the race to build the tallest structure in the British Empire set off a competition among cities across Canada. Successive record holders included the Traders Bank of Canada, 15 floors, Yonge St, Toronto, 1905, the Dominion Building, 13 floors, Vancouver, 1910, World (Sun) Tower, 17 floors, Vancouver, 1912, the Canadian Pacific Building, 16 floors, Toronto, 1913, the Royal Bank, 20 floors, Toronto, 1915, the Royal Bank, Montreal, 1928, the Royal York Hotel, Toronto, 1929 and the Canadian Imperial Bank of Commerce, Toronto, in 1931.

=== Central heating ===
The construction of skyscrapers, grand hotels and other large buildings led to the development of central heating, an essential feature in Canada's cold climate. In the 20th century such systems were used to provide heat to small communities such as university campuses, northern industrial towns or military bases. Smaller systems were used in private homes. Another technique, the convection method, was introduced to domestic dwellings at this time. A metal furnace in the basement, using wood or coal as fuel, would heat air in a plenum which would rise by convection through a series of metal ducts into the rooms of the house above. When the air cooled it would fall to the floor and return to the plenum through another series of metal return ducts. In later years an electric fan was used to force the hot air from the plenum through the ducts.

=== Domestic and consumer technology ===
The introduction of the flush toilet in the US and Canada in the 1880s created a market that inspired the invention of rolled toilet paper. The product was first produced in the US by the Albany Perforated Wrapping Paper Company in 1877. The US Scott Paper Company began manufacturing toilette paper in 1902 and by 1925 Scott Paper was the largest manufacturer of toilette paper in the world. As early as 1926 the Purex brand had been established in Canada and with the arrival of Scott Paper Canada in 1927 the White Swan brand was introduced.

=== Medicine ===
The introduction of medical x-rays during this period dramatically improved medical diagnostics. Discovered by Roentgen in Germany in 1895, x-ray units were in operation at the Toronto and Montreal General Hospitals by the turn of the century. The sphygmomanometer or blood pressure meter, that familiar device employing a cuff placed around the patients arm, found its way into the office of most Canadian doctors in the early 20th century. The spread of bovine tuberculosis, a crippling childhood disease, was curbed through the introduction of pasteurized milk in Montreal and Toronto at the turn of the century. This practice was soon followed by the dairy industry across Canada.

Bayer began marketing the wonder drug of the age, aspirin, in 1899. It was an instant success and quickly became popular in Canada. Originally sold as a powder, the tablet was introduced in 1914. A very important step in the mass production of medical products was taken that same year when John Fitzgerald founded an institution that would be named the Connaught Laboratories in 1917, at the University of Toronto. Initially the laboratories produced vaccines and antitoxins for smallpox, tetanus, diphtheria and rabies. In 1922 after the Nobel Prize winning work on Banting and Best the facility began to manufacture insulin.

In 1914 John Fitzgerald established laboratories in Toronto to produce vaccines for smallpox, rabies, diphtheria and tetanus. The facility was named the Connaught laboratories in 1917 in honour of Prince Albert, the Duke of Connaught the recently retired Governor General. Beginning in 1922 the laboratories began to mass-produce the newly discovered hormone insulin.

The chlorination of municipal drinking water, a technique known to kill bacteria and thus make the water safer for human consumption, was introduced in Toronto in 1910. It became widely used across Canada in the years that followed.

=== Defence ===
The 13- and 18-pound muzzle-loading gun field gun with modern recoil and sighting systems were acquired at the turn of the century. A notable acquisition was the first breech-loading gun, in Canadian use, the 13-pound quick-firing (Q.F.) and 18-pound Q.F. firing shrapnel and high-explosive rounds, in 1905. The Royal Canadian Navy founded in 1910, took possession of its first ships, two tired steel-hulled former Royal Navy cruisers, the Rainbow, in 1910, stationed at Esquimalt on the west coast and the Niobe at Halifax on the east coast.

== Automobile Age (1920–1950) ==
During the post-World War I era, a plethora of technologies were introduced, including the car, air service, air navigation, paved roads, radio, the telephone, refrigeration, wonder drugs and powered farming, mining and forestry equipment.

=== Transportation, the car and aeroplane ===
Ford was the first major automobile manufacturer in Canada, introducing the Model C in Walkerville, Windsor in 1904 and the Model T in 1909. By 1913, the company was producing internal combustion engines in Canada. Other notable Canadian car manufacturers included General Motors, Chrysler, and Studebaker. The popularity of cars in Canada led to the development of new infrastructure, including paved roads, traffic lights, and snowplows, and the decline of streetcars. The automobile industry also led to the rise of do-it-yourself car maintenance and repair shops, with Canadian Tire being a notable example. Long-distance travel by aircraft also became more practical in the postwar years. The Canadian north was developed with the use of small float-equipped bush planes.

=== Communications, radio ===
In 1901, Guglielmo Marconi sent radio signals across the Atlantic Ocean. He established a machine to produce electromagnetic waves at Cornwall in England and a machine to detect these waves at Signal Hill in St. John's Newfoundland. On 12 December 1901 he announced that he had received the transmission of waves sent by the transmitter in England at the station in St John's.

In Montreal, in 1920, XWA (CINW (AM)) became the first commercial AM radio broadcaster in the world. Both the AM transmitter and receiver used analog technology. The following year CKAC became the first French- language AM radio broadcaster in Canada. State operated national radio broadcasting chains were established beginning in the late 1920s, including the CNR National Radio Network, 1927, the Canadian Radio Broadcasting Commission Radio Network, 1932 and the Canadian Broadcasting Corporation Radio Network, 1936. Private independent AM broadcast operations sprouted like mushrooms in cities large and small across Canada during the thirties and forties. Canadian Marconi Company (CMC Electronics) formed in Montreal in 1903 and Northern Electric, manufactured radios for home use, the first mass-produced electronic equipment in Canada. The circuits of these devises were based on analog technology.

The teleprinter became a popular technology with telegraph companies beginning in 1922. When used with the telegraph system it permitted the automated printing of thousands of telegraph messages and became the backbone of the telegram service offered by the Canadian National Telegraph Company formed in 1920 and the Canadian Pacific Telegraph Company.

The wirephoto, was introduced in the US by Associated Press in 1935. This technology permitted the transmission of a photograph by use of telephone wires and became widely used by newspapers for reporting purposes. The technology was quickly introduced to Canada by Canadian Press (1917), which provided the service to newspapers across the country. Canadian Press also became the exclusive provider of Canadian wirephotos for Associated Press.

The Canadian film industry experienced mixed success during the twenties and thirties. Film maker Ernest Shipman produced five features between 1920 and 1923 before meeting with financial failure. The successful Canadian-owned Allen Theatre chain attained an important place in the exhibition market before being taken over by Famous Players Canadian Corporation (Cineplex Entertainment) in 1923. The technology of the talking cinema or "talkies" was introduced to Canada in 1927 by that company to take advantage of the arrival of talking films produced in Hollywood. The first Canadian "talkie" was "The Viking", an adventure story about sealing off the coast of Newfoundland, produced in 1931.

Associated Screen News of Canada in Montreal produced two notable newsreel series, "Kinograms" in the twenties and "Canadian Cameo" from 1932 to 1953. The regular production of short films by the newly created Canadian Government Motion Picture Bureau began in the 1930s. British law encouraging filmmaking in the Commonwealth led Hollywood to circumvent the spirit of the concept by establishing film production companies to make American films in Calgary, Toronto, Montreal and Victoria. These companies produced a small number of features but closed operations when the British law was changed to exclude their films. In 1941, Odeon Theatres of Canada opened a new cinema chain to compete with Famous Players.

The making of documentary films grew tremendously during World War II with the creation of the National Film Board of Canada in 1939. By 1945 it was one of the major film production studios in the world with a staff of nearly 800 and over 500 films to its credit, including the very popular The World in Action and Canada Carries On series of monthly propaganda films.

=== Materials ===
Plastics were also introduced during these years. In Toronto, Plastics Ltd. began to produce Bakelite soon after its invention in 1909. Another firm, Canadian Electro Products of Shawinigan, Quebec, invented polyvinyl acetate which was used in copolymer resins and water-based paints. The wartime production of nitrocellulose naturally led to the manufacture at Shawinigan in 1932, of transparent cellulose film used for packaging. What is now called fibreglass was invented in the US in 1938 at Owens-Corning by Russell Games Slayter and introduced to Canada shortly thereafter.

Aluminum also became popular. In 1902, attracted by the availability of cheap hydro power, the Aluminum Company of America established a Canadian subsidiary, the Northern Aluminum Company (Alcan) at Shawinigan Falls, Quebec to produce that metal using the electrolysis technique. Corporate changes led to the creation of the Aluminum Company of Canada (Alcan) in 1925 and in 1926 the company constructed a giant aluminum smelter at a place it named Arvida, Quebec. Once again the site was chosen for the availability of cheap hydro electricity and the proximity of a deep-water port at Bagotville for large ships carrying bauxite or aluminum ore. World War II accelerated the demand for aluminum, which was the principal material in aircraft production and the Arvida facility was greatly expanded. In 1958 another huge Alcan smelter was built at Kitimat, British Columbia.

The growth in popularity of the car also created a need for rubber for automobile tires. Accelerated by the emergency of World War II, a substantial synthetic rubber production industry was established at Sarnia, Ontario in the early forties. The oil refineries there provided a ready source of raw materials. In particular, the Suspensiod crackers operated there by Imperial Oil produced large quantities of hydrocarbon gases. These were used by a new Crown enterprise, Polymer Corporation created in 1942, and associated private companies, St. Clair Processing Corporation Ltd., Dow Chemical of Canada Ltd., and Canadian Synthetic Rubber Ltd., itself a subsidiary of four Canadian rubber companies, Dominion, Firestone, Goodyear and Goodrich, to produce both GR-S and butyl type synthetic rubber. Initially production was destined for wartime use on military vehicles but in postwar years output was quickly redirected to civilian automobile production.

The closely related synthetic textile industry appeared in the years just after the First War. The production of artificial silk, more properly known as viscose rayon, made from bleached wood pulp, began in Cornwall, Ontario in 1925, in a factory built by Courtaulds (Canada). A year later Celanese Canada began making acetate yarn in a new plant in Drummondville, Quebec. DuPont Canada was the first to manufacture nylon yarn in Canada at its factory in Kingston, Ontario in 1942. This secret material was initially used for parachutes but following the war was used to make nylon stockings.

Asbestos has long been known for its fibrous and heat resistant properties. With the rise of the automobile, asbestos became an important material, being used to make brakes. The world's largest asbestos mine, the Jeffrey Mine in Asbestos, Quebec had its beginnings in the 1878 when a local farmer W. H. Jeffrey began to mine the substance there. Original mining methods were primitive and involved blasting, the use of chisels to remove the mineral from the rock by hand and a crane powered by one horse. By 1895, 2300 tons of asbestos were being removed from the open pit mine per year. The mine was purchased by the Johns-Manville Company of the US in 1918 and has since become the largest asbestos mine in the world, over two kilometres in diameter and 350 metres deep. The material was used for insulation in buildings and ships and, of course, for automobile brakes. However, serious health problems, including lung cancer, have been associated with its mining and use, and in recent years mining activity there has diminished.

=== Industry ===
With the rail building era coming to an end, the rise of the automotive industry in southern Ontario provided the Hamilton steel mills of the Steel Company of Canada and the Dominion Foundries and Steel Company with a new market. Dofasco introduced the basic oxygen steelmaking at its mills in Hamilton in 1954. In the latter part of the century, Algoma, in Sault Ste. Marie, built coke oven batteries and blast furnaces, while phasing out the open-hearth and Bessemer steel-making process in favour of the basic oxygen steel-making.

The industrial production of bread became notable during these years. At the beginning of the 20th century it is estimated that only about 8% of Canadian wives bought bread commercially. However, the industrial production of bread grew impressively and by the 1960s, 95% of homemakers purchased bread commercially. One bakery of note, The Canada Bread Company Limited, was founded in 1911 as the result of the amalgamation of five smaller companies. Industrial bakeries such as this were characterized by the use of large machines for the mixing of dough, which was placed in pans on slow moving conveyor belts that transported them through giant ovens, where they were baked. Large automated packaging machines wrapped the finished loaves at great speed. Improvements in transportation and packaging technology throughout the decades allowed a shrinking number of bakeries to serve every larger markets. In 1939 there were about 3200 commercial bakeries across the country but by 1973 the figure stood at 1700, while in 1981 there were 1400.

Meat packing grew to become Canada's most important food processing industry during this period. In Calgary, Alberta, in 1890, Pat Burns established P. Burns and Company, which became the largest meat processor in western Canada. In Toronto in 1896 the innovative Harris Abattoir was established to export chilled sides of beef to the British market. The industry grew rapidly during the war, supplying meat to Canadian and British troops overseas. However, it underwent a period of consolidation in the twenties due to a loss of markets. This led to the merger of two major players, William Davies and the Harris Abattoir, to form Canada Packers in Toronto. By 1930, "The Big Three", meat packers in Canada were Canada Packers, Swift Canadian and P.Burns and Company in Calgary, Alberta.

The increasing popularity of the electric refrigerator in Canadian restaurants and homes made it practical for manufacturers to make available various frozen foods. The first such offering, a frozen strawberry pack was produced in Montreal and Ottawa beginning in 1932 by Heeney Frosted Foods Ltd.

=== Consumer technology ===
Cold breakfast cereal became increasingly popular during these years. Wheat and later corn flakes were developed in the US by the Kellogg brothers in 1894 and the Kellogg Company was formed in 1906. In London, Ontario the Canadian Corn Company purchased the rights to manufacture and distribute Toasted Corn Flakes for Canadian distribution. In 1924 the American Kellogg Company purchased the London operation and formed Kellogg Canada Inc. Since that time the company has manufactured and distributed in Canada a wide variety of breakfast cereals including Corn Flakes, 1907, Bran Flakes, 1915, All Bran, 1916 and Rice Krispies, 1928.

Although neither the tin can nor soups were remarkable in any way in the thirties, the combination of the two in the form of the well known Campbell's soup was very popular. The Campbell Soup Company introduced its soup products to Canada in 1930, making them at its factory in Toronto on the lake shore.

Instant coffee was another tasty innovation introduced during these years. The inventor and world leader in the manufacture of instant coffee, the Swiss-based Nestlé Company began operations in Canada with the production of canned condensed milk at its plant, The Maple Leaf Condensed Milk Company, in Chesterville, Ontario in 1918. Head office research invented instant coffee and began selling it around the world including Canada, as Nescafe in 1938. It became hugely popular with allied troops during World War II. In 1952 the instant chocolate drink, Nestle Quik, was introduced to Canada.

The sanitary napkin and Kleenex brand facial tissue were introduced in the 1920s. Kimberly, Clark and Co. (Kimberly Clark) formed in the US in 1872, invented cellucotton in 1914. It used this material as the basis for a sanitary napkin and marketed the product as Kotex beginning in 1920. Kleenex, initially intended for the removal of face cream, was introduced in 1924. In 1925 the company formed what would become, Canadian Cellucotton Products Limited, for the marketing of these and other products in Canada and internationally. The first practical electric razor, the Sunbeam "Shavemaster" and the Remington "Close Shaver" made available in the US in 1937 and in Canada shortly thereafter.

With a base of caustic soda, the world's first oven cleaner, Easy-Off, was invented in Regina in 1932 by Herbert McCool and manufactured in his home in that city until 1946, when production shifted to Iberville, Quebec. The product has since become the most popular oven cleaner in the world.

=== Architecture ===
The grand hotel continued to make a mark with new structures, including the Bigwinn Inn, Muskoka, Ontario, 1920, the Jasper Park Lodge, Jasper, Alberta, 1922, the Hotel Newfoundland, St. John's, Newfoundland, 1926, the Hotel Saskatchewan, Regina, Saskatchewan, 1927, the Prince of Wales Hotel, Waterton Lakes National Park, Alberta, 1927, the Lord Nelson Hotel, Halifax, Nova Scotia, 1928, The Pines, Digby, Nova Scotia, 1929, the Royal York Hotel, Toronto, 1929, the Chateau Montebello, Montebello, Quebec, 1930, the Nova Scotian Hotel, Halifax, Nova Scotia, 1930, the Charlottetown Hotel, Charlottetown, P.E.I. and the Bessborough Hotel, Saskatoon, Saskatchewan, 1935.

In 1875 in Montreal, a McGill student, J. Creighton, established the basic rules for ice hockey as we know it today. The world's first facility dedicated to hockey, the Westmount Arena was built in Montreal in 1898 while the first industrial refrigeration equipment for making artificial ice in Canada was installed in 1911 by Frank and Lester Patrick for their new arenas in Vancouver and Victoria. The Mutual Street Arena, with its artificial ice surface, was built in Toronto in 1912. With the development of wide span roof structures the construction of large indoor ice rink stadiums became possible. These two technologies were used to build the Montreal Forum, home of the legendary Montreal Canadiens hockey team, in Montreal in 1924 and Maple Leaf Gardens home of the Toronto Maple Leafs, in that city in 1931. Baseball's facilities were upgraded with construction of the new Maple Leaf Stadium on Lake Shore Boulevard in Toronto in 1926 and the De Lormier Downs Stadium (Hector Racine Stadium), in Montreal in 1927. Civic Stadium, now Ivor Wynne Stadium, was built in Hamilton, Ontario in 1930, to host the British Empire Games held there that year.

The construction of the very large, Basilica of Sainte-Anne-de-Beaupré, near Quebec city was completed in 1926.

There were also advances in the lighting of public, commercial and industrial buildings. In 1938, after decades of development in the US and Europe, General Electric in the US, and shortly thereafter Westinghouse, began to sell the fluorescent lamp. Because of its lower power consumption its use was quickly adopted for large-scale applications. These lights were quickly made available to the Canadian market through the Canadian subsidiaries of these two companies.

=== Civil engineering and public works ===
Notable engineering works of the period included the Second Narrows Bridge, Vancouver, 1925, the R.C. Harris Filtration Plant, Toronto, Ontario, 1926, the Peace Bridge, Fort Erie, Ontario, 1927, the Champlain Bridge (Ottawa), 1928, the Ocean Terminals, Halifax, Nova Scotia, 1928, Sea Island Airport (Vancouver International Airport), Vancouver, 1929, the Ambassador Bridge, Windsor-Detroit, 1929, the Windsor-Detroit Tunnel, 1930, the Broadway Bridge, Saskatoon, Saskatchewan, 1932, the Île d'Orléans Bridge, near Quebec City, 1934, the Thousand Islands Bridge, Ontario, 1937, the Pattullo Bridge, Vancouver, 1937, the Lion's Gate Bridge, Vancouver, British Columbia, 1938, Malton Airport (Toronto Pearson International Airport), Toronto, 1938, the Blue Water Bridge, Sarnia, Ontario, 1938, the Queen Elizabeth Way, Ontario, 1939, the Rainbow Bridge (Niagara Falls), 1941, Dorval Airport, (Montréal-Pierre Elliott Trudeau International Airport), Montreal, 1941 and the Alaska Highway, Dawson Creek, British Columbia, 1942.

Canada's first major roller coaster the Crystal Beach Cyclone was built at the Crystal Beach Amusement park in 1927. It quickly gained a reputation for its wild and even violent ride and one passenger, Amos Wiedrich was killed in 1938 when he stood up to take off his coat while the coaster was in motion.

The dump truck and bulldozer were introduced during these years for a variety of earth moving tasks including road building and canal construction. The dump truck was invented in Saint John, New Brunswick in 1920 by Robert T. Mawhinney and the bulldozer was developed in the US in 1923. Both quickly became popular worldwide.

=== Medicine ===
Medical treatment benefited from the introduction of the electrocardiograph, used to diagnose heart problems, in large hospitals in the late twenties. There were also important innovations with respect to the treatment of epilepsy during this period. In Montreal, Wilder Penfield, with a grant from the US Rockefeller Foundation, founded the Montreal Neurological Institute at the Royal Victoria Hospital (Montreal), in 1934 to study and treat epilepsy and other neurological diseases.

=== Defence and nuclear technology ===
The military suffered a huge decline in the 1920s and 1930s. The Royal Canadian Air Force founded in 1924, was largely a bush and float plane operation. Only in the 1930s did it acquire a modest combat capability with a handful of British Armstrong Whitworth Siskin fighters and a squadron of Hawker Hurricane fighters as the clouds of war grew menacing. The Royal Canadian Navy, perpetually starved for equipment acquired its first custom-built ships, the destroyers HMCS Saguenay (D79) and HMCS Skeena (D59) on May 22, 1931. In 1929 the army began to retire its horses and was issued four 6-wheeled Leyland tractors in 1929, to tow its 60-pound guns. Four 3-inch 20-cwt. anti-aircraft guns were taken on strength in 1937. As a reflection of this intense and diverse engineering activity, the Canadian Council of Professional Engineers was established in 1936. This organization was renamed Engineers Canada in 2007.

Canada was involved in the wartime Manhattan Project to build an atomic bomb, including the Montreal Laboratory for nuclear research by scientists from Britain, and American contracts with Canadian firms Eldorado Gold Mines for mining and processing uranium and a heavy water plant built by Consolidated Mining and Smelting (CMS) at Trail, British Columbia.

== Television Age (1950–1980) ==
The years following World War II introduced even more innovations, including television, the transistor radio, synthetic fabrics, plastic, computers, super highways, shopping centres, atomic energy, nuclear weapons, transcontinental energy pipelines, long range electric transmission, transcontinental microwave networks, fast food, chemical fertilizer, insecticides, the birth control pill, jet aircraft, cable TV, colour TV, the instant replay, the audio cartridge and audio cassette, satellite communications and continental air defence systems.

=== Communications (television and the transistor radio) ===
In the early 1980s Canadian Satellite Communications (Cancom) assembled a package of Canadian and American television channels which it offered to remote communities throughout the northern regions of Canada. The signals were distributed by Anik satellite and made available to the local populace through cable. By the later part of the decade several hundred communities were using this service.

There was also technological innovation in the telephone system. The first trans-Atlantic telephone cable, jointly owned by the Canadian Overseas Telecommunication Corporation, British Post Office and AT&T, was brought into service in 1956, paving the way for telephone calls from Canada to Britain and Europe. An improved cable, CANTAT was installed in 1961. A similar service on the west coast, COMPAC, the Commonwealth Pacific Cable System was inaugurated in 1963, linking Canada by undersea telephone cable with New Zealand and Australia. CN/CP Telecommunications introduced the well known Telex service to Canada in 1956. Direct distance dialing was initiated in Canada in 1958, beginning with customers in Toronto and on 1 July of that year the Trans-Canada Microwave system, known as the Trans-Canada Skyway, went into service. The concept and operation of a dedicated emergency telephone number originated in Canada, where the City of Winnipeg established the world's first 9-1-1 service in 1959. The service eventually spread and was offered continent wide.

=== Communications (satellites) ===
The Anik (satellite) series of communications satellites initially built by Hughes Aircraft and operated by Telesat Canada starting in 1972 formed the basis of the world's first domestic satellite communications service. Telesat has launched a large number of satellites including, Anik A1 – 1972, Anik A2 – 1973, Anik A3 – 1975, Anik B – 1978, Anik D1 – 1982, Anik C3 – 1982, Anik C2 – 1983, Anik D2 – 1984, Anik C1 – 1985, Anik E2 – 1991, Anik E1 – 1991, MSAT – 1996, Nimiq 1 – 1999, Anik F1 – 2000, Nimiq 2 – 2002, Anik F2 – 2004, Anik F1R – 2005, and Anik F3 – 2007.

"Dataroute", the world's first national digital data system was introduced by CN/CP in 1973.

=== Nuclear weapons ===
After considerable political turmoil Canada acquired nuclear weapons from the Americans under a "dual key" arrangement on 1 January 1963. Genie air-to-air rockets armed with atomic warheads were based at RCAF Stations Comox, British Columbia, Bagotville, Quebec, and Chatham, New Brunswick, as the primary weapon for the newly acquired CF-101 interceptor. The nuclear armed BOMARC (Boeing Michigan Air Research Corporation) anti-aircraft missile was based at RCAF Stations North Bay, Ontario, and Lamacaza, Quebec. In Germany, as part of Canada's NATO commitment, nuclear free-fall bombs were acquired for the RCAF CF-104 strike fighter and the Canadian Army in Germany took possession of a battery of Honest John surface-to-surface battlefield rockets armed with nuclear warheads. By 1984 all these atomic weapons had been returned to the United States.

While there were no accidents involving nuclear weapons in Canadian hands, there were at least two involving USAF aircraft flying in Canadian airspace. On 14 February 1950 a USAF B-36 heavy bomber, serial 44-92075, carrying one Mark 4 (Fat Man type) atomic bomb experienced multiple engine failures while flying south off the coast of British Columbia and jettisoned the bomb over Squally Channel. The crew bailed out and the plane flew on autopilot for another 330 km before crashing on a mountainside in the Kispiox Valley. In eastern Canada on 10 November 1950, a USAF B-50 heavy bomber, serial 46-038, flying from Goose Bay, Labrador, to the United States, experienced engine trouble and in accordance with standard operating procedures, jettisoned the Mark 4 atomic bomb it was carrying over the St. Lawrence River, near Rivière-du-Loup. The bomb's own 2200 kg conventional explosives blew it apart before it hit the water. The plane flew on to a base in the US.

=== Computers ===
Computers were introduced in a variety of areas at this time. The National Research Council Canada experimented with fire-control computers towards the end of the war. The University of Toronto Computer Centre, established in 1947, developed Canada's first operational computer the University of Toronto Electronic Computer (UTEC) in 1951. This was followed by the purchase of FERUT (Ferranti University of Toronto) computer, by the Computer Centre in 1952. The NRC used this computer in the early fifties for the hydrographic modeling of the St. Lawrence Seaway then under construction. Computers were also developed by other organizations, including the National Research Council, the NRC Computer (1954–1960), Ferranti Canada, mail sorter (1955), Computing Devices of Canada, the "Kicksorter" (1957–1963), the Defence Research Board, the DRTE (1960) and Sperry Canada, UMAC-5 (1962). Avro Canada in Toronto worked unsuccessfully to develop the fire-control computer for the Velvet Glove air-to-air missile for the highly advanced but ill-fated Avro Canada CF-105 Arrow interceptor. Avro Canada made extensive use of computers in calculations for aircraft design and manufacturing processes, including CNC. Other military developers included the Royal Canadian Navy with its DATAR system for the command and control of warships.

In the 1950s the Pinetree, Mid-Canada and DEW Line air-defence radar chains built across Canada relied heavily on computers. Certainly the largest and most powerful computer in Canada at the time was the IBM/USAF developed AN/FSQ-7, installed in the late 1950s, 700 feet (210 m) underground at RCAF Station North Bay, as the "brain" of the DEW Line System. The machine contained 55,000 vacuum tubes, weighed 275 tons and occupied a half-acre of floor space. It could perform 75,000 instructions per second.

By 1958 there were 41 computers in operation in Canada with big business, universities or the military. The most popular was the IBM 650, which was used by 19 organizations, including Canadair Limited, Canadian General Electric, Ford Motor Company of Canada, Great West Life Assurance Company, Imperial Oil Limited, Orenda Engines Limited and the University of Toronto. Other models in use included the Bendix G-15, 4, the ALWAC III-E, 3, the IBM 705, 3, the UNIVAC II, 3, the Datatron 205, 2, the LGP-30, 2, the Borroughs E 101, 1, the IBM 704, 1, and the NRC 102A/D.

One of the first commercial users of computers was Trans-Canada Airlines (TCA). In 1961 Ferranti-Packard developed the ReserVec computer reservation system for TCA (now Air Canada). This formed the basis for the Ferranti-Packard 6000 computer, and in 1963 two were sold in Canada, one to the Defence Research Establishment Atlantic, in Dartmouth, Nova Scotia and the other to the Toronto Stock Exchange.

In 1961 the Royal Bank of Canada was the first bank in Canada to introduce computers for its operations, followed by the Toronto-Dominion Bank in 1962. It was soon followed by the other large Canadian banks, including the Canadian Imperial Bank of Commerce and Bank of Nova Scotia. When they introduced the credit card about the same time these records were kept on large central computers as well. It was this experience with large computer systems linking hundreds of branch offices across the country that enabled the banks to introduce the ATM and the debit card, across Canada in the 1980s. Computers were also introduced to control complex industrial processes. Interprovincial Pipe Line Limited of Edmonton was one of the first Canadian companies to employ computers as a means of controlling the flow of gas in its very large pipeline system. Atomic Energy of Canada Limited used computers to control atomic fission in its power reactors. In 1977 the Toronto Stock Exchange became the first stock market in the world convert to electronic trading with the introduction of its Computer Assisted Trading System. Twenty years later, in 1997, the exchange closed its trading floor and converted to a fully automated, computer-driven trading system.

Computers were also recognized as a tool for policing. The Canadian Police Information Centre which was established in 1966 under the auspices of the RCMP, has operated, since that date, a national computer data base that provides information relating to criminal activity in Canada.

During this period Canada Post applied computer readable codes to speed the delivery of mail. On 1 April 1971 the postal code system was introduced. The technique involved the use of a six-character geographic code placed on the envelope or parcel by the sender. The code was in turn machine scanned by a computer-driven optical reader that signaled the sorting equipment to direct the item to the proper destination. While technically effective, the introduction of the system lead to serious labour trouble at Canada Post for several years by unionized workers who were afraid of pay cuts or job loss (Postal codes in Canada).

=== Transportation ===
In transportation, several significant works were completed, including the Toronto Subway, 1954, the Trans-Canada Gas Pipeline, 1958, the St. Lawrence Seaway, 1959, Trans-Canada Highway, completed in 1962, the Montreal Subway, 1966, GO Transit, Toronto area, 1967 and Highway 401, Ontario, completed in 1968.

On August 10, 1949, the Avro Canada C102 Jetliner, a mid-range four-engine passenger jet, made its first flight, just 13 days after the world's first and eight years before the US's first, the Boeing 707. Trans-Canada Airlines (later Air Canada) and Canadian Pacific Airlines introduced jet passenger service with the de Havilland Comet, DC-8, DC9, B727 and B-737. The B-747 was introduced by these companies in the early seventies. In the sixties and early seventies De Havilland Aircraft of Canada in Toronto developed the DHC-7 Dash 7 and DHC-8 Dash 8 STOL aircraft. These were used to provide passenger service to small city centre airports in Toronto, Ottawa and Montreal. A number of international carriers also acquired these aircraft to provide similar services elsewhere in the world. The first Canadian owned helicopter began operation in Canada on 12 March 1947. On that date Photographic Survey Corporation took possession of a Bell Bell 47B-3, registration CF-FJA.

The development of trans-oceanic aviation in the postwar years created a need for accurate weather information over the Atlantic and Pacific Oceans. An international agreement in 1946 established 13 Ocean Weather Stations with Canada being responsible for two, ocean station Baker several hundred miles off the east coast from 1947 to 1950 and for ocean station Papa 900 miles (1,400 km) off the coast of Vancouver from 1950 to 1981. A number of ships, both converted RCN vessels and purpose built CCG weather ships were stationed at these points to gather weather information during these years. Ships involved included, HMCS St. Stephen, HMCS St. Catherines, HMCS Stone Town, CCGS Vancouver, and CCGS Quadra.

Of note was the transit of the Northwest Passage in 1954 by HMCS Labrador, Canada's first purpose built icebreaker, which was acquired that same year, in service with the Royal Canadian Navy.

Of particular significance was the conversion from steam to diesel by Canada's two great railways. Beginning in the mid fifties the CPR and Canadian National Railways began replacing their steam locomotives with diesel locomotives. By 1960 the conversion was mostly complete.

The Volkswagen was introduced to Canadians in 1952 and became very popular with drivers who wanted greater fuel economy than that provided by the larger cars then on the market. It was sold in Canada until 1977. The seat belt became a standard feature of domestic passenger cars in the late sixties. The catalytic converter was also introduced during these years. The first devices, designed to reduce air pollution from automobile exhaust, were installed in the 1975 model year for US cars manufactured in Canada. Because of environmental concerns and the fact that it was not compatible with these converters, the major gasoline companies in Canada began to eliminate the sale of leaded gasoline that same year.

Although Armand Bombardier invented the snowmobile, the initial production model, the B-7 dating from 1937 was a large 7 passenger vehicle. It was not until 1959 with the development of the small gas engine that the individual snowmobile or Ski-doo was produced by Bombardier (Bombardier Recreational Products) in the company factory at Valcourt, Quebec. A number of competitors in Canada and elsewhere entered the market and sales of snowmobiles skyrocketed with 2 million being sold worldwide between 1970 and 1973. To this day, snowmobiles remain popular in Canada and other regions with snowy winters.

Pedestrian walkways have become important features of some Canadian cities. Climate controlled underground passageways and shopping malls have been features of the downtown cores of Toronto (PATH (Toronto)) and Montreal (Underground City, Montreal) since the mid-sixties. Arguable the most unusual, is the Plus 15 system in downtown Calgary. Initiated in 1970 it presently consists of 57 bridges and 16 km of enclosed climate controlled passageways suspended 15 feet (4.6 m) above ground level which permit pedestrians to walk anywhere in the downtown core summer or winter without ever going outside.

=== Atomic energy ===
Beginning in the mid-1950s nuclear-generated electricity was developed under a partnership of industry and government at both the federal and provincial levels. A demonstration power reactor, the NPD was built at Rolphton, Ontario in 1962, followed by a commercial-scale CANDU prototype at Douglas Point in 1968. In 1971 electricity became commercially available from the large (ultimately 8-unit) Pickering station near Toronto, Ontario and, starting in 1977, the Bruce station (ultimately 8-units as well), near Kinkardine, Ontario. These were followed by the Gentilly-2 Atomic Electric Plant, Trois-Rivières, Quebec and the Point Lepreau Atomic Electric Plant, Point Lepreau, New Brunswick both in 1982. The electric current supplied by commercial hydro companies to consumers was changed and organizations like Hydro Ontario converted from 25 cycles to 60 cycles during the ten-year period from 1949 to 1959.

The introduction of this technology was not without mishap. On 12 December 1952 the experimental NRX reactor at Chalk River suffered a failure of its cooling system and underwent a partial meltdown. On May 24, 1958, the newly commissioned NRU reactor, also at Chalk River, experienced a major accident when one of the uranium filled fuel rods caught fire and seriously contaminated the reactor building with radioactive debris.

=== Energy (oil and gas) ===
The modern era of oil production in Canada began in 1947 when Imperial made its major discovery at Leduc, Alberta. The availability of oil and gas in Alberta, a half continent away from central Canada provided the impetus for the construction of two huge transcontinental pipelines to the eastern Canadian market. The crude oil pipeline was the first to be built. The construction of first section of the Interprovincial Pipeline from Edmonton to Regina to Superior Wisconsin in the US began in 1950 and was completed in an astonishing 150 days. In 1953 the pipeline was extended through the US to Sarnia, Ontario and from Sarnia to Toronto in 1957. At the time of its completion it was the longest pipeline in the world. The oil and gasoline industry has grown tremendously since then, mainly to meet the demand for gasoline created by the popularity of the car and for home heating oil. Major oil refineries have been built in Vancouver, British Columbia, Edmonton, Alberta, Sarnia, Ontario, Montreal, Quebec and Saint John, New Brunswick.

The construction of the transcontinental oil pipeline was followed by that of the gas carrying Trans-Canada pipeline. Work began in 1956 at the Alberta/Saskatchewan border advancing to Regina, Winnipeg and Port Arthur, Ontario in 1957. Construction was not without mishap as during a pressure test in 1957 five kilometres of pipe blew up near Dryden, Ontario. The line crossed the very technically difficult Canadian Shield north of Lake Superior and reached Toronto and Montreal in 1958. At the time of its completion it was the longest pipeline in the world. Political controversies related to the construction of the pipeline contributed to the fall of the St. Laurent Liberal government in 1957. Gas pipelines were also built in Alberta, the largest being that of Alberta Gas Trunk Lines, incorporated in 1954 and British Columbia, where the Westcoast Transmission Co. system was completed in 1957. While large pipelines carried natural gas across the continent smaller distribution systems were necessary to carry gas into factories and individual homes, where it was used as a source of heat. Very complex local understreet pipeline networks were constructed in cities across Canada to meet this requirement.

Other energy projects of the period included the Lakeview Generating Station, Mississauga, Ontario, 1962, the W.A.C.Bennett (hydro) Dam, British Columbia, 1967, the Gardiner (hydro) Dam, Saskatchewan, 1968, the Churchill Falls Hydro Dam, Labrador, 1971, the Nanticoke Generating Station (largest coal-fired plant in North America), Nanticoke, Ontario, 1978 and La Grande 2 Hydro Dam, Quebec, 1979. The energy crisis of 1973 had domestic repercussions with many consumers taking steps to reduce energy costs through the installation of improved home insulation and wood-burning stoves.

The existence in Alberta of large quantities of surface bitumen (oil) mixed with sand has been known for many years. In the late 1970s the commercial production of synthetic crude oil from this bitumen began near Fort McMurray. Construction at this site, by a company known as Syncrude, began in 1973 and the first crude oil was produced there in 1978. The complex and costly production process involves scraping the sticky bitumen-laden sand from the surface, transporting it to a processing facility, removing the sand from the bitumen and upgrading the bitumen to a product known as light sweet crude. The technical scale of the operation is very large. Initially the sandy tar-like bitumen was scrapped from the ground using gigantic powered rotating mechanical wheels equipped with scraping buckets and the oil sand was placed on conveyor belts for transport to the processing plant. However, the severely cold Albert winters caused the continuous breakdown of the machinery and a new technique was developed. This involves the use of gigantic power shovels and dumptrucks to deliver the bitumen laden sand to the processing plant. Once at the plant the bitumen is removed from the sand with a process that involves the use of hot water. The bitumen is then subjected to fluid coking, hydroprocessing, hydrotreating and reblending. Syncrude is the largest producer of synthetic crude oil from bitumen sand in the world and the largest producer of oil from a single site in Canada.

=== Industry ===
The forestry industry underwent a notable process of mechanization in the postwar years. The most visible change was the introduction of the chain saw. When originally developed for modern use in the 1920s, this heavy, gasoline engine-driven machine required two men for its operation. However, improvements in engine technology eventually made the saw small and light enough to be operated easily by one person. In 1944 one of the first industrial users, Bloedel Stewart and Welch Ltd. in British Columbia had 112 chain saws in operation, but their use accounted for only a small part of total forestry tree cutting. In 1950 less than one percent of pulpwood in Canada was cut with chain saws. However, by 1955 this figure had grown to more than 50%.

Other machines were also introduced during this period. The first feller buncher was used by the Quebec North Shore Paper Company in 1957. Hydraulic tree shears were first used in 1966 by the Abitibi Pulp and Paper Company Limited (Abitibi-Consolidated). Snowmobiles and tracked machines replaced animals for the hauling of logs. In 1948 several Bombardier machines were employed to this end by the Ste. Anne Power Company Limited in Quebec. In 1959 Timberland Machines of Woodstock, Ontario developed the Timberbuncher, a self-propelled machine which could move through the forest, cut a whole tree at its base (a process known as full tree harvesting) and, using a hydraulic arm, place it into a pile for hauling. Machines that stripped the branches from felled trees, a process known as delimbing, were also introduced at this time.

With the help of these technologies, the Canadian pulp and paper industry grew to become one of the major suppliers of newsprint in the world through the operations of companies such as MacMillan Bloedel Limited, Repap Enterprises Inc., Kruger Inc., Great Lakes Forest Products Ltd, British Columbia Forest Products Ltd., Consolidated-Bathurst Inc., Canadian Forest Products Ltd., CIP Inc., Domtar Pulp & Paper Products Group and Abitibi Consolidated.

The use of pesticides was a prominent feature of postwar agriculture across Canada. Insecticides based on fluorine, arsenic, rotenone, nicotine pyrethrum as well as herbicides using sulphuric acid, arsenites and salt and finally fungicides based on sulphur, mercury or copper have been very effective in controlling life forms that degrade agricultural output. At the same time these compounds have also had a negative effect beyond their intended sphere of use. DDT was registered for use in Canada from 1946 until 1985, when its use was banned. The product was never manufactured in Canada. Food irradiation, in particular the irradiation of potatoes to prevent sprouting while in storage, was approved for use in Canada in 1960.

Potash-based chemical fertilizer became an important element of increased agricultural production in Canada and around the world in the postwar era. In Saskatchewan techniques were introduced for the mining of the huge potash deposits found there. These involve both "dry" and "wet", methods of mining. The dry method involves the sinking of a vertical shaft and the use of large powered cutting machines to cut into the potash horizontally. The wet technique known as solution mining is used to access potash at greater depths. This involves drilling a vertical hole into the deposit into which is pumped hot water. The liquid dissolves the potash underground and then returns to the surface, where another process separates the mineral from the water.

=== Office automation ===
Business administration underwent technological change. The ball point pen was marketed in the US in October 1945 and in Canada shortly thereafter. The IBM Selectric typewriter, introduced in 1961, quickly became popular with businesses in Canada, as did the Xerox photocopier in the 1960s.

=== Medicine ===
There was important progress in medical technology during this period. In 1945 Stuart Stanbury established a National Blood Transfusion Programme for the Canadian Red Cross Society, thus making available to those in need, a dependable source of blood for medical purposes. The associated test for blood typing was introduced at the same time. Blood tests would become increasingly sophisticated in the coming years. The electroencephalograph, used for the diagnosis of neurological disorders was introduced in major Canadian medical institutions in the late forties.

The techniques for the mass production and distribution of vaccines and for the mass public inoculation were introduced during these years. Polio was a disease that affected large numbers of Canadian children during the first part of the 20th century. In the US, research by Jonas Salk in the late 1940s led to the discovery of vaccine for the prevention of this disease. However, there was no technique for volume manufacture of the drug. Connaught Laboratories of Toronto developed a synthetic culture known as "medium 199", which enabled the mass production of this polio vaccine beginning in 1952. A successful all-Canadian mass inoculation of children using the new vaccine was undertaken in the spring of 1955, the first such mass public health campaign of its type in Canada. Antibiotics such as penicillin were quickly made available to the general public in the postwar years.

There was also progress with respect to the treatment of heart disease. The pacemaker invented with significant Canadian participation was used to treat patients with arrhythmia. For more serious problems open heart surgery became an option for patients and permitted the repair of faulty heart valves, the clearing of blocked coronary arteries and the resolution of other problems. Canada's first heart transplant was performed on 31 May 1968, by Pierre Godin the Chief Surgeon at the Montreal Heart Institute, on patient Albert Murphy of Chomedy, Quebec a 59-year-old retired butcher suffering from degenerative heart disease. The operation took place about six months after the world's first, by Christiaan Barnard. Neurosurgery was introduced in a substantive way in the 1960s.

Cancer patients were provided with a new option, radiation therapy, through what was popularly known as the "Cobalt Bomb", again developed with important Canadian input. The use of radio isotopes for diagnostics was also introduced. Chemotherapy also became a treatment option. In 1960 the use of a subcutaneous arteriovenous shunt along with the artificial kidney machine allowed hemodialysis for patients with chronic renal failure.

During these years the Montreal Neurological Institute pioneered the development of medical imaging technologies introducing Canada's first CAT scan in 1973, PET scan in 1975 and MRI in 1982. The technique of medical ultrasonography also became widely available beginning in the late 1960s and was especially popular with expectant mothers interested in the health and sex of their fetus. The number of these machines in use has grown greatly over the years. In 2004 there were about 150 MRI units and about 350 CAT units in use in Canada.

The corneal contact lenses first developed in 1949 gained mass appeal in Canada and elsewhere in the 1960s. Made of polymethyl methacrylate (PMMA) they could be worn up to 16 hours a day.

Developments in orthodontics made the straightening of the teeth of children with "braces" commonplace. Children were also often on the receiving end of the tonsillectomy a fashionable surgical procedure during these years.

The surgical replacement of body parts also became possible and was used to treat ailing kidneys and joints such as knees and hips. The availability of cosmetic implants became popular during these years. In 1962, in the US, Dow Corning developed the silicone gel-filled breast implant which was used by women for surgical breast augmentation. The procedure was common in Canada. In recent years implants containing saline solution have also become popular.

Pharmaceuticals attained a high-profile. The availability of the birth control pill in 1960 made it possible for women to protect themselves from unwanted pregnancy. Stress could be treated with tranquilizers, such as valium, introduced in 1963. The consumption of vitamins became widespread and supplements were added to staple foods such as milk and bread and were taken in pill form. While most of these drugs were safe, one, thalidomide, had horrific consequences for its users. Thalidomide was invented in West Germany in 1954 by Chemie Grunenthal as a sedative. It was noted that the drug was particularly effective in treating the symptoms of morning sickness associated with pregnancy. The drug was made available under prescription to Canadians beginning 1 April 1961. Tragically it was discovered that the drug caused miscarriage and severe birth defects. As a result, the drug was withdrawn from the Canadian market on 2 March 1962.

The "recreational" use of "soft drugs" such a marijuana, LSD and hashish became part of the 1960s counter culture. Marijuana was often produced locally using the hydroponic method.

=== Domestic and consumer technology (in the home) ===
The car, cheap gasoline and postwar affluence created boom conditions for the expansion of suburbia. Several standard designs for the single family home on a standard lot were reproduced cookie-cutter style row-upon-row in cities across Canada as subdivision after subdivision sprang up radiating from the central core. The designs were thoroughly modern, reflecting the optimism of the era, usually with a peaked roof, asphalt shingles and a brick or wood siding exterior and included a living room, kitchen and occasionally dining room and two, three or four bedrooms and a full basement made of poured concrete or cinder block. Floors were usually made of varnished hardwood planks and the walls and ceilings of gyprock. Copper piping brought running water from the serviced street and copper wiring electricity from the rear lot line. Clay tile pipe carried the sewage from the flush, sit toilet to the main sewer line running under the street. There was usually a driveway beside the house for the family car, and less frequently a carport or garage.

Most homes were equipped with a telephone often with a "party" line but these became rare by the 1960s. A television set was also common in almost all homes by the end of the 1950s and the record player gave way to the hi-fi stereo. Almost all kitchens were equipped with electric refrigerators and electric or less commonly gas, stoves. Where there was gas it was usually piped to the home through a main line running under the street. There were a variety of electrical "labour saving" devices including electrical mixers can openers and carving knives. Central heating was a standard feature and coal, delivered to the home by a diesel powered truck, was the dominant fuel source in the early postwar years. However, as the 1950s progressed coal gave way to oil and gas heating. Home furnishings were almost all mass-produced and made from wood, fabric and various types of stuffing for cushions. In the kitchen metal chrome tube chairs and formica topped tables were popular. The small front and back yard were maintained with the help of a gasoline-powered lawn mower, and the hedge and bushes were trimmed with electric clippers. In the early 1960s the high-rise apartment building began to make its appearance in large cities. The self-supporting steel structures were usually seven stories or more, and large buildings contained hundreds of dwelling units. Initially they were especially visible along Highway 401 in Toronto, Metropolitan Boulevard in Montreal and the north shore of English Bay in Vancouver. Their construction was possible due to the introduction of the high-rise crane, which to this day remains a common feature of city skylines.

The arrival of television had an effect on eating habits. In 1953, C.A. Swanson & Sons introduced the TV dinner to the US market. The pre-cooked food items, including, meat, potatoes and a vegetable were placed in the segments of an aluminum tray and frozen. The consumer purchased the frozen product and heated it in the oven for about 25 minutes. It could be eaten out of the tray. In 1960, Swanson, a subsidiary of the Campbell Soup Company, built a factory in Listowel, Ontario to manufacture TV dinners and other Campbell frozen products for the Canadian market. The electric toothbrush introduced in 1959 has become very popular in Canada since the 1990s.

The steel aerosol spray can with the gas propellant, and "crimp on nozzle" was developed in the US in 1949. It quickly became a favored type of packaging in Canada for a number of products including whipped cream, deodorant, bug spray and hair spray. The gas propellant, usually a chlorofluorocarbon (CFC), became a target for environmental concern in the 1970s when research demonstrated that it had a harmful effect on the ozone layer in the atmosphere. The international Montreal Protocol of 1989 banned the use of these substances and they were subsequently replaced with volatile hydrocarbons. The disposable diaper was introduced to the Canadian market in 1972 by Procter & Gamble Canada Ltd. The chemistry of hair colouring was introduced to the domestic scene in the US and Canada in 1956, when Clairol began marketing a home hair colouring kit for women that could be purchased for a modest price at a local pharmacy or grocery store. Invented in Canada, the green plastic garbage bag (Bin bag) was introduced to Canadians in the late 1960s. Patented in 1955 by Swiss engineer, George de Mestral, velcro, a two sided fastening technology based on hooks and loops, was introduced to a number of countries, including Canada, in the late 1950s. In Montreal, Velek Ltd. acquired the exclusive marketing rights for velcro in North and South America and Japan.

The format for sound recordings changed in the years just following the war. In the US, Columbia Records introduced the long-playing (LP) 33 1/3 format in 1948. Columbia made an agreement with Sparton Records, of London, Ontario, established in 1930, for the manufacture and distribution of its LP records in Canada. Not to be caught short, RCA Victor in the US responded in 1949 with its own technological innovation the 45 rpm record (with the big hole in the centre) and manufactured and distributed this new format for the Canadian market through its Canadian subsidiary, RCA Victor of Canada, established in Montreal in 1929. The video home system (VHS) released in 1976 by Victor Company of Japan, Limited (JVC), quickly became popular in Canada and was used to record TV programmes or to play VHS tapes of Hollywood movies that could be rented in neighborhood video stores that soon became a common feature of suburban strip malls. In 2003 the popularity of DVD surpassed VHS and by 2006 the technology had become obsolete.

The introduction of the credit card complemented the appearance of the shopping mall. In 1968 a number of Canadian banks including the Bank of Nova Scotia, the Royal Bank of Canada, the Toronto-Dominion Bank and the Canadian Imperial Bank of Commerce began issuing the Chargex credit card to customers. In 1977 these cards were reissued by the same banks under the Visa brand name. The Mastercard credit card became available to Canadians in 1973.

=== Domestic and consumer technology (in the Suburbs) ===
The booming growth of the suburbs led to the appearance of the shopping mall, a low-rise steel frame, commercial structure housing a number of retail outlets and surrounded by acres of asphalt parking lot for large numbers of cars. The first in Canada included the Norgate Shopping Centre, Saint-Laurent, Quebec, 1949, the Dorval Shopping Centre, Dorval, Quebec, 1950, the Park Royal Shopping Centre, West Vancouver, British Columbia, 1950, the Sunnybrook Plaza, Toronto, 1951 and York Mills, Toronto, 1952.

The hospitality industry was similarly affected and fast food drive-in restaurants began to appear. In 1951 the first St. Hubert BBQ restaurant opened its doors on St-Hubert street in Montreal. A&W opened its first Canadian operation in Winnipeg, Manitoba in 1957. In 1959 Harvey's opened its first eatery on Yonge Street in Richmond Hill. In Hamilton, Ontario, the first Tim Hortons restaurant opened in 1964. The first McDonald's restaurant outside the United States was opened in Richmond, British Columbia in 1967 and Pizza Delight was founded in Shediac, New Brunswick, in 1968.

Cinema attendance boomed after the war and with it innovations in cinema design. The first double-screen cinema, The Elgin, opened its doors in Ottawa in 1946 and the drive-in cinema became popular after the war. However, the long cold Canadian winters discouraged the widespread diffusion of this type of film exhibition. The dramatic IMAX large-scale cinema format was invented as the result of developments in cinematic technology during Expo '67 in Montreal. The world's first permanent Imax cinema, Cinesphere, was built at Ontario Place in Toronto in 1971. Others were built in Vancouver for Expo '86 and at the Canadian Museum of Civilization in Gatineau, Quebec, in 1989. By 1995 there were 129 Imax cinemas entertaining audiences around the world. The audio cartridge and audio cassette became popular in the early 1970s with the cassette eventually winning the battle of the formats. This compact medium led to the appearance of high quality in-car sound systems.

The New Woodbine Racetrack for thoroughbred horse racing opened to the public in Toronto in 1956 (simply Woodbine after 1963) replacing the original Woodbine which was built in 1874. Canada's first purpose-built auto racing track, the Westwood Motorsport Park was built in Coquitlam, British Columbia in 1959. The Mosport International Raceway, north of Bowmanville, Ontario opened to the public in 1961 and hosted the Canadian Grand Prix Formula 1 races from 1967 to 1977. La Ronde became Canada's largest amusement park when it opened in 1967 as part of Expo '67 in Montreal. It is popular to this day for a number of roller coasters, including The Boomerang, Cobra, Goliath, Le Monstre and Vampire.

=== Materials ===
Detergent, a replacement for soap, introduced in the postwar years, was used to keep clothes and dishes clean through the action of its active ingredient, tetrapropylene, a derivative of petroleum. The popular Tide brand became available in 1948. In 1964 permanent press fabrics were invented in the US by Ruth Rogan Benerito, a scientist at the Physical Chemistry Research Group of the Cotton Chemical Reactions Laboratory and introduced to Canada shortly thereafter. The press resulted from the treatment of the fabric with formaldehyde. Invented by DuPont scientist Roy J. Plunkett in 1938, polytetrafluoroethylene, a polymer considered the world's most slippery substance, was introduced commercially as Teflon, in 1946 in the US. It is used in a wide variety of applications, including as a non-stick coating on the cooking surface of pots and pans and is manufactured in Canada by DuPont in Mississauga, Ontario. Krazy Glue (ethyl cyanoacrylate) was introduced to Canada in 1973.

=== Waste disposal and sewage treatment ===
In the postwar years Canadian municipalities began treating raw sewage, which up to that time, with a few notable exceptions, had been allowed to flow directly from their sewer systems into nearby streams, rivers, lakes and oceans. New facilities were added in Toronto including the Highland Creek Wastewater Treatment Plant in 1956 and the Humber Wastewater Treatment Plant in 1960. Vancouver built a number of sewage treatment facilities including the Lions Gate Wastewater Treatment Plant in 1961, the Iona Island Wastewater Treatment Plant in 1963 and the Lulu Island Wastewater Treatment Plant in 1973. The City of Ottawa built the Green's Creek Pollution Control Center (now Robert O. Pickard Environmental Centre) in 1961. In 1970 the City of Montreal began the construction of a large sewer network which channeled all effluent to the treatment plant at Rivière-des-Prairies on the east end of the island and became operational in 1996. By 1980, 64% of Canadians were served by sewage treatment, with the figure rising to 78% in 1997.

Public and industrial concern with air pollution and acid rain led to measures being taken by a number of companies to cut back on harmful atmospheric emissions. In 1972, Inco undertook steps to reduce emissions of SO2 and other gases by installing scrubbers and a 1,250-foot (380 m) chimney at its Copper Cliff smelter in Ontario.

=== Public works and civil engineering ===
Bridges of note included the Angus L. Macdonald Bridge in Halifax 1954, the Oak Street Bridge, Vancouver, 1957, the Burlington Bay James N. Allan Skyway, 1958, Ogdensburg-Prescott International Bridge, 1960, the Queensborough Bridge, Vancouver 1960, the Sault Ste. Marie International Bridge, Sault Ste. Marie, Ontario, 1962, the Champlain Bridge, Montreal, 1962, the Lewiston-Queenston Bridge, Niagara Falls, Ontario, 1962, the Port Mann Bridge, Vancouver, 1964, the Macdonald-Cartier Bridge, Ottawa, 1965, the Pont de la Concorde (Montreal), 1966, the Prince Edward Viaduct, Toronto 1966, the Laviolette Bridge, Trois-Rivières, Quebec, 1967, the Saint John Harbour Bridge, Saint John, New Brunswick, 1968, the Dinsmore Bridge, Vancouver, 1969, the A. Murray McKay Bridge, Halifax, 1970, the Pierre Laporte Bridge, Quebec City, 1970, the Portage Bridge, Ottawa, 1973 and the Arthur Laing Bridge, Vancouver, 1976.

This was also an era of gigantism, and there were both successes and failures. Beginning in 1963, massive civil engineering works were undertaken in the St. Lawrence River in Montreal to build the site for the 1967 World's Fair, known as Expo 67. The gigantic Red River Floodway, which opened in 1968, was designed to carry flood water from a rising Red River around the heart of the City of Winnipeg. It was completed in 1968 and proved successful when used for the first time in 1969. At the time of its completion it was the second largest earth-moving project in the world, after the Panama Canal.

Northwest of Montreal thousands of acres of fertile farmland were expropriated to build the huge new Mirabel International Airport, which opened in 1975. The facility was to be linked to the heart of Montreal with a fast train. The train was never built and both passengers and air carriers stayed away in droves. The site eventually became a quiet industrial airport, home to the production facilities for Bombardier regional jets. On the other hand, the James Bay Project undertaken in Quebec at the same time was a booming success. Several large dams on the La Grande River with their associated long distance transmission lines provide Hydro-Québec with an important source of electricity.

The CN Tower, the world's tallest free-standing structure, was constructed in Toronto in 1975.

=== Architecture ===
Important skyscrapers, including Place Ville Marie (Royal Bank), Montreal, 1962, the Canadian Imperial Bank of Commerce Tower, Montreal, 1962, the Edifice Trust Royal (C.I.L. House), Montreal, 1962, the Toronto Dominion Bank Tower, Toronto, 1967, The Simpson Tower, Toronto, 1968, the Hôtel Château Champlain, Montreal, 1967, the Royal Trust Tower, Toronto, 1969, Royal Centre, Vancouver, 1972, Inco Superstack, Sudbury, Ontario, 1972, First Canadian Place, Toronto, 1975, Harbour Centre, Vancouver, 1976, the Complexe Desjardins, la Tour du Sud, Montreal, 1976, the Scotia Tower, Calgary, 1976, the Scotia Tower, Vancouver, 1977, Royal Bank Plaza, South Tower, Toronto, 1977 and the First Bank Tower, Toronto, 1979, represented significant architectural achievements during this period.

The massive Saint Joseph's Oratory, the largest church in Canada, the construction of which began in 1924, was completed in 1967 on the north slope of Mont Royal in Montreal.

Notable large sports facilities included, Empire Stadium, Vancouver, 1954, McMahon Stadium, Calgary, Alberta, 1960, the Montreal Automobile Stadium (Autostad) 1966, the Olympic Stadium, Montreal, 1976 and Commonwealth Stadium (Edmonton), 1978.

== PC Age (1980–2000) ==
Microelectronics became a part of everyday life during this period. The personal computer became a feature of most homes, and the microchip found its way into a bewildering variety of products from cars to washing machines.

=== Microchip and digital computing ===
In 1977 the first commercially produced personal computers were invented in the US: the Apple II, the PET 2001 and the TRS-80. They were quickly made available in Canada. In 1980 IBM introduced the IBM PC. Microsoft provided the operating system, through IBM, where it was referred to as PC DOS and as a stand-alone product known as MS-DOS. This created a rivalry for personal computer operating systems, Apple and Microsoft, which endures to this day. A large variety of special-use software and applications have been developed for use with these operating systems. There have also been a multiplicity of hardware manufacturers which have produced a wide variety of personal computers, and the heart of these machines, the central processing unit, has increased in speed and capacity by leaps and bounds. There were 1,560,000 personal computers in Canada by 1987, of which 650,000 were in homes, 610,000 in businesses and 300,000 in educational institutions. Canadian producers of micro-computers included Ogivar, Sidus Systems, 3D Microcomputers, Seanix Technology and MDG Computers. Of note is the fact that these machines were based on digital technology, and their widespread and rapid introduction to Canada at the same time that the telephone system was undergoing a similar transformation would herald an era of rapid technological advance in the field of communication and computing.

The laptop computer also appeared during these years and achieved notable popularity in Canada beginning in the 1990s. In 1981 the first commercially available portable computer, the Osborne 1, became available. Other models followed, including the Kaypro II in 1982, the popular Compaq Portable and Tandy Corporation TRS-80 Model 100 both in 1983, the IBM PC Convertible, 1986, the Macintosh Portable, 1989 and Power Book, 1991. The latter models in particular were popular with both professionals and consumers.

In the 1970s and 1980s word processing, a method for "typing" documents using a keyboard linked to a computer and a video screen, was developed. Early machines were dedicated exclusively to this function and a notable Canadian contribution, the Superplus IV, produced by AES Data in Montreal in 1981, became widely popular. However, the rise of the personal computer and the invention of PC-compatible word processing software, such as WordPerfect in 1982 and Microsoft Word in 1983, made stand-alone word processors obsolete. Spreadsheet software also became popular for accounting purposes, notably Microsoft Excel, which was also introduced to the world and Canadian market in 1983. These new machines with their new software quickly dominated the market and became an almost universal feature of any Canadian office.

=== Supercomputers ===
In 1987 there were considerable numbers of larger computers in Canada, including 25,000 mainframe and mini-computers. But the most powerful of all were the supercomputers. The Meteorological Service of Canada has been a noted user of large computers and has pioneered the Canadian use of supercomputers. Machines used have included the Bendix G20, 1962, an IBM 360-95 scientific mainframe computer, 1967, its first supercomputer a CDC 7600 from Control Data Corporation, 1973, a Cray 1S supercomputer, 1983, a NEC supercomputer, 1993 and an IBM supercomputer in 2003. At the time of its installation this latter machine was the most powerful computer in Canada.

The Communications Security Establishment (CSE), Canada's "electronic spy" agency has been a notable user of supercomputers. CSE code breaking capabilities degraded substantially in the 1960s and 1970s but were upgraded with the acquisition of a Cray X-MP/11 (modified) supercomputer delivered to the Sir Leonard Tilley Building in Ottawa, in March 1985. It was, at the time, the most powerful computer in Canada. In the early 1990s, the Establishment purchased a Floating Point Systems FPS 522-EA supercomputer at a cost of $1,620,371. This machine was upgraded to a Cray S-MP superserver after Cray acquired Floating Point Systems in December 1991 and used the Folklore Operating System supplied by the NSA in the US. These machines are now retired. Little information is available on the types of computers used by the CSEC since then. However, Cray in the US has produced a number of improved supercomputers since then. These include the Cray SX-6, early 2000s, the Cray X1, 2003 (development funded in part by the NSA), Cray XD1, 2004, Cray XT3, Cray XT4, 2006, Cray XMt, 2006 and Cray CX1, 2008. It is possible that some of these models have been used by the CSEC and are in use today.

In 2008, Canada's most powerful research computer, an IBM supercomputer, was installed in Toronto. The $20 million machine, about the size of an SUV, can make 12.5 trillion computations per second and will be used for proteomics research by the Ontario Cancer Institute, the Princess Margaret Hospital (specializing in cancer) and the University Health Network. An IBM System x iData Plex supercomputer began operation at the University of Toronto in 2009. However, the supercomputer used by Environment Canada for weather forecasting remains the largest in Canada.

=== Communications: digitization and fibre optics ===
Canada's major telephone companies introduced digital technology and fibre optics during this period paving the way for more advanced business and customer telecommunications services.

In 1976 Nortel developed the first digital private branch exchange (PBX) in the world. That same year Nortel announced its "Digital World" project, which foresaw the development and market introduction of a complete family of digital switching, transmission and business communications systems.

In 1977 Bell Canada began to conduct a fibre optic field trial to residential customers in Montreal. The Manitoba Telephone System began to introduce fibre optics in that province beginning with customers in Elie, in 1981. In 1984 Sasktel, the provincially owned telephone company in Saskatchewan, completed the construction of a 3,268 km. long commercial fibre optics network to fifty-two communities in that province. In 1984 CNCP Telecommunications began the construction of a trans-Canada fibre optic network. By 2009, the national fibre optic system in Canada stretched 7000 kilometers across the country and included underwater fibre links to PEI (1985) and Newfoundland. Eight fibres are reserved for Trans-Canada traffic.

On 1 July 1985, Cantel and Bell Cellular began to offer cell phone service in Canada. They used a technical standard known as CDMA, which was compatible with mobile phone systems in the US but not elsewhere in the world. The fax began to make its presence felt in offices across Canada in the early 1980s.

The Globe and Mail began to produce its contents in electronic form in 1979. A year later in 1980, in order to enable the daily distribution of the Toronto-based paper across the country, in a bid to become Canada's "national newspaper", it began the transmission of its contents via Anik Satellite to regional offices, where it was printed and distributed.

Bluetooth technology, developed in 1994 by Ericsson, was introduced to Canadian consumers at that time. The technique permits the very short range radio communication of Bluetooth equipped electronic devices with each other for the purposes of information transfer. It is designed to eliminate the need for wires and cables to connect such machines.

=== Lasers ===
The use of lasers became common throughout Canada during these years. The devices are usually found as components of larger systems.

Lasers are used in the field of telecommunications, where they are act as the modulated light sources for fibre optic systems. The high frequency of the pulsed beams of light they produce enables the transmission of large quantities of information and the absence of an electromagnetic field around the fiber optic cable lessens transmission loss and increases the security of the data. Lasers are also used in many mechanical manufacturing systems to start and stop processes, measure component size and monitor and maintain quality.

In public they are commonly found at the retail checkout counter, where they scan bar codes. They are also used to open and close doors for people and cars and are common in public washrooms, where they control the flow of water for taps and the flushing of urinals and toilettes.

Their use in medicine has been growing. They are used to "burn" plaque from clogged arteries, to remove the decayed portion of teeth in dental treatment and to treat vision problems related to retinal detachment and near sightedness (lasik surgery).

The Lidar, a laser-based instrument, is used by meteorologists to determine the height of the cloud base.

=== Transportation ===
Smaller vehicles became popular in response to the oil crisis of 1973. In 1981 the Chrysler K platform introduced by that company formed the basis for the compact K-car. Front wheel drive was widely introduced to North America by the Big Three US automakers beginning in 1978, when the Plymouth Horizon and Dodge Omni, both with transverse mounted engines, became available. A wide variety of front wheel-drive-models were quickly offered to Canadians by other car makers. The air bag safety feature was introduced during these years. In the US, the 1973 model Oldsmobile Toronado was the first passenger car equipped with an air bag. Ford introduced air bags as an option in the Tempo in the US in 1984 and Chrysler made them a standard feature in 1988. Air bags were made available in the Canadian market as this feature became available in US models.

The semi-trailer truck (18 wheeler), became the dominant vehicle on the heavily used Highway 401 (Ontario). Containerization, which had made headway in ocean shipping with the construction of terminals in Halifax, Montreal and Vancouver also led to the eventual elimination of the railway box car and began to make inroads in the trucking industry. Light rail systems were built in Edmonton, Alberta in 1978, Calgary, Alberta, in 1981 and Vancouver, British Columbia in 1986.

The Ontario Highway 407 Express Toll Road (ETR), opened in Toronto in 1997 to ease the burden of traffic on Highway 401 which passes through the heart of the city to the south. Special technology is used to collect tolls without the use to toll booths. Regular users can equip their cars with a transponder that sends a signal to highway sensors when the vehicle enters and leaves the road. For those vehicles without a transponder, special electro-optical sensors read the number plate and a bill for the toll is sent to the vehicle owner in the mail.

In 1996 GM Canada introduced the OnStar service to Canadian and US customers who chose this option when purchasing a new car. Considered a safety feature, the service provides emergency services, vehicle diagnostics and directions to drivers on the road. It is based on GPS technology as well as CDMA mobile phone technology provided in Canada by Bell Mobility. There is a 24-hour emergency response centre in Oshawa for vehicles located in Canada.

In the 1990s, a national weather radar surveillance system for aviation and general use was established. The initial system, the Canadian weather radar network, established by Environment Canada, became operational in 1997 and consisted of 18 weather radars using the 5 centimetre wavelength (C-Band) and one using the ten-centimeter wavelength (S-Band). In 1998 that organization received approval to add another 12 radars and to upgrade the system to the Pulse-Doppler radar standard.

Also in 1997 the responsibility for air traffic control in Canada was transferred from Transport Canada to Nav Canada. The control system (commonly described as very large and complex) operated by that organization uses a number of technologies, including 1400 ground-based navigation aids, 46 radars and six Automatic dependent surveillance-broadcast systems, which are based on global positioning technology.

Technological improvements have also enhanced rail safety during these years. These include a large number of incremental changes to elements of rolling stock including wheels, axles, trucks, couplers and brakes. There have also been improvements to tracks including continuous weld, concrete sleepers and switching techniques. Techniques of traffic control and communication have also been improved.

=== Industry ===
Bombardier's invention of a new class of aircraft, the regional jet or RJ, allowed airlines to introduce jet passenger service to smaller centres. The design of this machine was facilitated through the use of computer-aided design software. In 2009, Bombardier Aerospace of Montreal, in cooperation with the National Research Council Canada began using robots for the assembly of its aircraft.

Factory farming of pigs and chickens in particular became a prominent feature of agriculture during these years. Large numbers of these animals are crowded into very large barns with controlled environments in an effort to maximize their growth and hence profit for the farmer. The use of antibiotics to fight infection, as well as the use of growth hormones is common. The growth in the number of these farms has been dramatic. The Fraser Valley in British Columbia is home to the highest concentration of such farms in Canada and the number of farms there increased from 56 in 1991 to 146 in 2001. The growth of genetically modified crops also became common. One of the most notable in this regard is canola. Developed in Canada from rapeseed during the 1970s by Keith Downey and Baldur Stefansson it is used to produce oil that is low in erucic acid and glucosinolate and has become a major cash crop in North America. A strain of canola with additional modification that made it resistant to herbicide was introduced in Canada in 1996.

=== Robotics ===
The use of computer-controlled robots in manufacturing (computer-aided manufacturing) as well as the closely associated, just-in-time inventory management technique, were pioneered in Canada by the auto manufacturers, who introduced them to improve efficiency. They were put to use in new auto manufacturing plants built, by Honda Canada in Alliston, Ontario and Toyota Canada in Cambridge, Ontario (1988). The techniques of robotic assembly-line manufacturing have improved over the years. As of 2009 robots form the basis for automobile production in Canada with a number of facilities and companies using this technology, including (city, company, model):

- Alliston, Ontario; Honda, Acura CSX, Acura MDX, Civic;
- Oshawa, Ontario, General Motors, Camaro, Chevrolet Impala;
- Ingersoll, Ontario, General Motors (CAMI – GM Suzike), Chevrolet Equinox, GMC Terrain;
- Brampton, Ontario, Chrysler, Chrysler 300, Dodge Challenger, Dodge Charger;
- Windsor, Ontario, Chrysler/Volkswagen, Chrysler Town and Country, Dodge Grand Caravan, Volkswagen Routan;
- Oakville, Ontario, Ford, Edge, Grand Marquis, Lincoln MKX;
- Cambridge, Ontario, Toyota, Matrix, Corolla, Lexus RX;
- St. Thomas, Ontario, Ford, Crown Victoria, Lincoln Town Car and
- Woodstock, Ontario, Toyota, RAV4.

=== Space technology: earth observation and geomatics ===
Geomatics, a term that originated in Canada, is a technique of computer-based mapping that integrates information from a variety of sources including, cartography, remote sensing (including images from RADARSAT), surveying, global satellite navigation systems, geodesy and photogrammetry. In the new century it has become an important tool used by Canadians in a variety of endeavours including, commerce, the environment, search and rescue, urban planning, defence and natural resource management among other things. The Geomatics Industry Association of Canada, founded in 1988, presently has a membership of more than 100 organizations.

During these years Canada's unmanned space programme included the first launching of a Canadian earth observation satellite, RADARSAT-1 in 1995 and an improved version RADARSAT-2 in 2007. Placed in polar orbits each of these satellites images almost the Earth's entire surface, every 24 days using a powerful synthetic aperture radar, SAR. The images have both operational and scientific applications and their data is of use in geology, hydrology, agriculture, cartography, forestry, climatology, urbanology, environmental studies, meteorology, oceanography and other fields. In 2009 the Canadian Space Agency announced a follow-up programme, RADARSAT Constellation, which will see the launching of three earth observation satellites, in 2014, 2015 and 2016 respectively, working as a trio to provide complete coverage of Canada's land and ocean surfaces as well as 95% of the surface of the world every 24 hours.

=== Energy, offshore oil and gas ===
The technology for offshore oil and gas extraction was introduced to Canada during these years. The first of several projects off of Canada's east coast was the massive Hibernia platform, a gravity base structure (GBS), built in Bull Arm, Newfoundland in the early 1990s. The 1.2 million ton structure was towed into place, 315 km to the south east of St. John's, Newfoundland, over the Hibernia off-shore oil reservoir, where it was positioned resting on the ocean floor in 80 meters of water with its superstructure rising 50 meters above the surface of the sea. In 1997 the facility began to pump oil from the sea bottom. The oil is stored in giant on-board tanks and continuously off-loaded by a fleet of dedicated shuttle tankers which transport it to the shore-based oil refinery at Come-by-Chance, Newfoundland.

The nearby Terra Nova, 350 km off shore, began to produce oil in 2002. The platform itself rests on the ocean floor and pumps oil from the sea bottom. However, unlike the Hibernia facility, the oil flows directly into a Floating Production Storage and Offloading (FPSO) vessel, the Terra Nova FPSO, where it is processed and stored. The oil in the storage tanks is then removed by a shuttle tanker. A third oil production facility in the same area, the White Rose (oil field), operated by Husky Petroleum, which began operation in 2005 also uses a Floating Production Storage and Offloading (FPSO) vessel, the SeaRose FPSO.

Undersea pipelines, the first in Canada and part of the Sable Offshore Energy Project have been introduced to transport gas from undersea wells off the coast of Nova Scotia since 2000. Gas was discovered near Sable Island in 1979 with the first platform and well head installed in the Thebaud field in 1999. An on-shore gas treatment facility was built at Goldboro and connected to the wellhead with a 225 km long undersea pipeline and production began in 2000. Other fields have been connected via undersea pipeline including the North Triumph, Venture, Alma and South Venture.

Other notable energy works included, the ill-fated east coast Ocean Ranger drilling platform, which sank in a storm in 1982 with the loss of all aboard, the Nova Scotia Power Corporation tidal generating station, Annapolis, 1984 and the Darlington Nuclear Generating Station, Darlington, Ontario, 1990. The construction of large-scale hydro-electric plants far from electric markets lead to the introduction of techniques for long distance electric power transmission. These techniques were used at a number of sites, including the W.A.C Bennett hydro station in British Columbia in 1968, Churchill Falls, Labrador, 1971 and the Robert-Bourassa generating station, 1981, the La Grande-3 generating station, 1984, the La Grande-4 generating station, 1986 and the La Grande-2-A generating station, 1992, all in Quebec.

=== Biotechnology ===
Biotechnology involves modifying living organisms to serve human goals. Biological techniques are derived from a number of sciences including, biology, chemistry, organic chemistry, biochemistry, genetics, botany, zoology, microbiology and embryology to name a few. In 1987, a number of Canadian companies and university research organizations operating in the field of biotechnology established the Industrial Biotechnology Association of Canada, also known as BIOTECanada. In 2005, the industry consisted of companies offering biotechnologically based services and products in the following sectors: human health (262 firms), agriculture (89 firms), food processing (54 firms), environment (33 firms), bioinformatics (16 firms), natural resources (21 firms) and aquaculture (15 firms). As of 2010 BIOTECanada had more than 250 members.

In 2005 noted bio-medical spenders on biotechnological research (research spending in millions of C$) included, Apotex Inc. (151.1), Pfizer Canada Inc. (147.5), GlaxoSmithKline Inc. (111.8), Merck Frosst Canada Ltd. (96.6), Biovail Corporation (88.9), AstraZeneca Canada Inc. (79.8) and Sanofi Pasteur Limited (76.6).

Another product of biotechnology, genetically modified crops, are grown throughout Canada. One of the most widely known, canola was developed in Canada through selective breeding in 1974. Canola oil is used in food products and in non-food items such as lipstick, candles, bio-fuels and newspaper ink. One of the largest suppliers of genetically modified seeds for food crops and animal feed in Canada is Monsanto Canada, established in Winnipeg in 1901.

=== Medicine ===
Medical treatment advanced during these years. The use of lasers and computers became important parts of medical treatment. Computers were essential in the development of new medical imaging devices such as the CAT scan, positron emission tomography and the MRI. Minimally invasive surgery, also known as laparoscopic surgery, reduced surgical damage to patients. Lasers were used with catheters for clearing blocked arteries and catheters with small cameras provided images of conditions inside the body. Coronary bypass surgery became commonplace. Laser eye surgery became popular in the 1990s and was used to improve visual acuity for the near-sighted. New chemical chemotherapy combinations helped prolong the lives of cancer patients. Techniques for the long-term application of medication through the use of a skin patch or implants appeared during these years.

A large number of medical drugs (List of bestselling drugs) for treating a wide variety of ailments such as high blood pressure, high cholesterol levels, arthritis, allergies, anemia, depression, asthma, osteoporosis and diabetes, became available to Canadians during this period.

The techniques for blood collection, processing and transfusion came under severe criticism in Canada during the 1980s, and led to Canada's worst-ever public health crisis. Between 1980 and 1985, 2000 recipients of tainted blood provided by the Canadian Red Cross were infected with the HI virus. Between 1980 and 1990, 30,000 Canadian transfusion recipients were infected with hepatitis C from tainted blood. About 8000 of those who received bad blood have died or are expected to die as a result. An investigation known as the Royal Commission of Inquiry on the Blood System in Canada was launched in 1993 and issued its final report in 1997.

A private company, IVF Canada of Scarborough, was the first to begin offering in vitro fertilization (IVF) in Canada beginning in 1983. Since that date the company has recorded a number of Canadian "firsts" in this field, including the first IVF pregnancy, first IVF twins, the first IVF triplets and the first baby born from a frozen embryo. Beginning in 1998 male erectile difficulties could be treated with the use of Viagra and other medications.

=== Domestic and consumer technology ===
There were innovations in home design and construction during this period. Houses generally became bigger. New materials such as vinyl siding became common and often replaced more expensive brick for home exteriors. The car port and garage became widespread features and the latter was often located close to the curb, creating a rather crowded streetscape. The home dishwasher and the microwave oven were introduced. Large-screen televisions usually of the cathode ray or projection type were found in many homes. The Sony Walkman, introduced in 1979, quickly gained popularity as a means for listening to music on the go. There were innovations in the field of domestic cuisine including the introduction of microwave popcorn. In 1981, the development of the susceptor bag (a paper bag impregnated with an aluminum-coated polyester film), allowed popcorn therein to be popped in a microwave oven without scorching.

The compact disc (CD) and the digital video disc (DVD) were introduced at this time. The CD, which appeared in 1982, became a favourite format for musical recordings. By 1986 most music stores in Canada had phased out the LP and replaced it with the CD. It was also used for other purposes including data storage in the form of the CD-ROM. A closely related format, the DVD, with greater storage capacity than the CD, was introduced in 1997. In 1986, Americ Disc of Drummondville, Quebec began to manufacture CDs and after 1997, DVDs and has become one of the largest suppliers of this product in North America. The infrared-based TV remote control became popular with Canadians in the early 1980s.

Video games have become a wildly popular form of entertainment especially for youth, since the 1980s. The earliest video game dated from 1947 and a number of devices were produced in the 1950s and 1960s. However, it was the development of the computer chip that led to their popularization. The coin-operated arcade game Pong introduced by Atari in 1972 was the first to become widely available. The next phase of development included the introduction in the mid-1970s of the home console, first with a hardwired game, but then complemented in 1977 by “plug and play”, which allowed the use of game cartridges for variety. Beginning in 1985 PC gaming became popular, exploiting the flexibility and increasing popularity of the personal computer. In 1989 Nintendo released its Game Boy, the first of the hand-held electronic games. Game imagery became more elaborate with the introduction of the 32-bit chip that was featured in the Sony PlayStation released in 1994. The 128-bit, sixth generation of video games was born with the introduction of the Sega Dreamcast in 1998. These technologies found a place in the Canadian consumer market from the moment of their introduction and Canadian companies have played a role in their development, with hardware makers like ATI Technologies developing high-powered video chips for game imagery and software companies developing a number of games.

Gore-Tex, a breathable, waterproof textile, was patented in the US in 1980. Clothing made from this product and designed for outdoor all-weather, sporting, athletic and recreational activity became available in Canada shortly thereafter.

The theme park became popular in the 1980s and the technology of thrill is the main attraction. In Toronto, Canada's Wonderland, Canada's largest, opened its doors to the public in 1981 and is now tied for second place in North America as the theme park with the most roller coasters (List of roller coasters at Canada's Wonderland). Galaxyland the world's largest indoor amusement park located in the West Edmonton Mall which opened in 1981 has garnered continent-wide attention. The most popular thrill ride, the Mindbender (Galaxyland) is the largest indoor triple-loop roller coaster in North America. The Drop of Doom was another featured attraction until closed in the early 2000s. The Mall's World Waterpark, which opened in 1985 offers bathers a chance to cavort in the world's largest indoor wave pool. The technology of auto racetrack design and construction has been put to good use in Montreal at the Circuit Gilles Villeneuve, Canada's premier auto race track and home of the Canadian Grand Prix Formula 1 motor car races since 1978. The slot machine, so dear to gamblers, was introduced during this period. Casinos have been built in Windsor, Caesars Windsor 1994, Niagara Falls, Niagara Fallsview Casino Resort 1996 and Orillia, Casino Rama 1996, Ontario, Montreal, Montreal Casino, Gatineau, Casino du Lac Leamy 1996 and Baie St. Paul, Casino de Charlevoix 1994, Quebec, Halifax, Casino Nova Scotia 1995, Nova Scotia and in Vancouver, the River Rock Casino Resort 2006, British Columbia.

The world's first automated teller machine (ATM) service was developed by the Sherwood Credit Union in Regina in 1977, at that institution's North Albert Branch. Other Canadian financial institutions followed this lead and by the 1980s the ATM was available throughout Canada.

During the 1980s the bar code became a familiar feature on consumer products ranging from food to clothes as did the bar code scanner at the retail checkout counter. These two technologies greatly improved the effectiveness of the check-out procedure and improved inventory management as well, through the associated computer accounting of stock. This was one of the factors leading to the technique of just-in-time inventory management for retail, commercial and industrial undertakings.

The payment of consumer purchases at the retail checkout counter through the use of an electronic debit card was introduced across Canada in 1994. Known as Interac, the system allows the consumer to swipe his personal card and with the use of a personal identification number have the amount of the purchase electronically deducted from his or her bank account. The service has since become very popular.

=== Waste disposal, recycling ===
Although the concept of recycling waste materials was not new, the Blue Box Recycling System for domestic refuse collection made the idea highly visible. Initially developed by Laidlaw Waste Systems for the Kitchener, Ontario, in 1983, it was introduced to Ontario municipalities in 1986, by Ontario Multi-Material Recycling Incorporated (OMMRI), and promoted by Nyle Ludolph, who became known as the Father of the Blue Box. The concept involved the use of blue plastic boxes which were distributed to home owners, who in turn filled them with recyclable refuse and placed them at curbside for weekly pickup. The refuse was taken to specially designed plants, where materials were sorted and recycled. The technique became popular in municipalities across Canada in the years that followed.

During these years the municipal garbage dump evolved to become the sanitary landfill site. A number of technologies, including clay and plastic liners were used to contain the smell and leachate. The largest in Canada, the Keele Valley Landfill was operated by the City of Toronto from 1983 until 2002, when it was closed because it was full.

Chlorofluorocarbons (CFCs), the gas propellants used in aerosol spray cans, became a target for environmental concern in the 1970s and 1980s when research demonstrated that they had a harmful effect on the ozone layer in the atmosphere. The international Montreal Protocol of 1989 banned the use of these substances and they were subsequently replaced with volatile hydrocarbons.

The problem with choice to reuse is still not available. There are many products that do not need to be recycled for a hundred years, but are put out monthly.

=== Architecture and civil engineering ===
Large architectural works of note included BC Place, Vancouver, 1983, Petro-Canada Centre, West Tower, Calgary, 1984, the West Edmonton Mall, Edmonton, Alberta, 1986, Scotia Plaza, Toronto 1988, the Canterra Tower, Calgary, 1988, the Sky Dome, Toronto, 1989, Bankers Hall, Calgary, 1989, BCE Place–Canada Trust Tower, Toronto, 1990, the Bay Wellington Tower, Toronto, 1990, Tour du 1000 de la Gauchetière, Montreal, 1991, Tour IBM-Marathon, Montreal, 1992 and GM Place, Vancouver, 1995.

New arenas for Canada's National Hockey League teams were built, including GM Place, Vancouver, home of the Vancouver Canucks in 1995, the Corel Centre in Ottawa, home of the Ottawa Senators and Molson Centre in Montreal, new home of the Montreal Canadiens, both in 1996.

Significant new bridges included the Alex Fraser Bridge, Vancouver, 1986, the SkyBridge, Vancouver, 1989 and the Confederation Bridge, NB-PEI, 1997.

== End note ==
In the earlier parts of Canada's history, the state often played a crucial role in the diffusion of these technologies, in some cases through a monopoly enterprise, in others with a private "partner". In more recent times the need for the role of the state has diminished in the presence of a larger private sector.

In the latter part of the 20th century there is evidence that Canadian values prefer public expenditures on social programmes at the expense of public spending on the maintenance and expansion of public technical infrastructure. This can be seen in the fact that in 2008 the Federation of Canadian Municipalities estimated that it would take $123 billion to restore and repair aging urban infrastructure across Canada.

== See also ==
- Technological and industrial history of 21st-century Canada
- Science and technology in Canada
- Canadian government scientific research organizations
- Canadian industrial research and development organizations
- Canadian inventions
- Canadian Mining Hall of Fame
- Canadian scientists
- Canadian space program
- Canadian university scientific research organizations
- CP Ships
- Energy policy of Canada
- Former tallest buildings in Canada by province and territory
- History of the petroleum industry in Canada
- History of aviation in Canada
- Internet in Canada
- List of aircraft of the Canadian Air Force
- List of airlines of Canada
- List of airports in Canada
- List of bridges in Canada
- List of Canadian Navy ships
- List of infantry weapons and equipment of the Canadian military
- List of reservoirs and dams in Canada
- Nuclear power in Canada
- Television in Canada
  - Digital television in Canada
  - Timeline of the Canadian Broadcasting Corporation
- Scientific research in Canada
- Economic history of Canada
