= Technological and industrial history of 21st-century Canada =

The technological and industrial history of Canada encompasses the country's development in the areas of transportation, communication, energy, materials, public works, public services (health care), domestic/consumer and defense technologies. That the 21st century has become the Internet Age is both literal and metaphorical. The technology that dominates this period of time is wireless technology, cloud computing, HD/3D TV, mega oil, "greentech" and nanotechnology. Most technologies diffused in Canada came from other places; only a small number actually originated in Canada. For more about those with a Canadian origin, see Invention in Canada.

Technology is a major cultural determinant, no less important in shaping human lives than philosophy, religion, social organization, or political systems. In the broadest sense, these forces are also aspects of technology. The French sociologist Jacques Ellul defined la technique as the totality of all rational methods in every field of human activity so that, for example, education, law, sports, propaganda, and the social sciences are all technologies in that sense. At the other end of the scale, common parlance limits the term's meaning to specific industrial arts.

== Fields of technology ==
=== Internet ===
The Internet has become an essential part of daily life and is found in most Canadian homes, businesses and government offices. In December 2006, there were 22,000,000 Internet users representing 65.9% of the population and 7,675,533 Internet broadband connections. In 1988, the first .ca Canadian web address, upei.ca, was assigned by John Demco of the University of British Columbia (UBC) to the University of Prince Edward Island. The one millionth .ca address, krauslaw.ca was assigned in 2008 by the Canadian Internet Registration Authority, formed in 1998, to Brent Kraus of Calgary for the promotion of his law firm. As of the end of 2010, Canadians, on a per-capita basis, were the most intensive users of Internet in the world.

During this period, the web search engine became an integral part of use of the Internet. The first such programme, the "Archie search engine", was developed by McGill University student Alan Emtage in 1990. Since then, search engines, which have been mostly developed in the US, have evolved and become more versatile and powerful. Notable engines include Lycos (1994), Alta Vista (1995), Magellan (1995), Google (1998), Yahoo! Search (2004), MSN Search (2005), and Bing (2009). These Internet tools are available to web users from countries around the world, including Canada.

E-mail, a very popular feature of the Internet, predated that technology by decades. E-mail type functionality was a feature of a computer sharing technology developed at MIT in the US in 1961. It was also part of the US-developed Semi Automatic Ground Environment (SAGE) component of the North American air defense system created in the fifties and sixties and which included a facility at RCAF North Bay, Ontario. However, it only became a publicly used service with the development of the Internet. A number of US providers now offer this worldwide service to Canadian users, including MSN Hotmail in 1996, Yahoo! Mail in 1997, AOL Mail in 2004 and Gmail in 2004.

The development of special software allowed the Internet to be used to make computer-to-computer phone calls. In August 2003, a service known as Skype became available to Internet users around the world including Canada. It has since become extremely popular.

Other web sites including those for social networking such as Facebook (2004), which as of 2008 has 17 million Canadian profiles, MySpace (2003), with 4.5 million Canadian profiles as of 2008, and Twitter (2006). Video and photo sharing sites such as YouTube (2005), with 14.5 million Canadian visits per month, and Vancouver-developed Flickr (2004), have become extremely popular in Canada. The popular Canadian-developed on-line dating service Lavalife went on line for the first time in 1997. In 2010, more than 2 million Canadians were members of LinkedIn, a social networking website, developed in the US in 2003 to enable workers to network for professional and career reasons. In recognition of the importance of the Canadian market, the company opened a Canadian office in 2010.

The big Canadian banks, including the Royal Bank of Canada, the Toronto Dominion Bank, the Canadian Imperial Bank of Commerce and the Bank of Nova Scotia made their customer accounts available on line as the web gained prominence. On-line investing has grown in popularity in the new century. A number of Canadian firms offer sites for this service including, QTrade Investor, BMO InvestorLine, E*Trade Canada (now Scotia iTrade), TD Waterhouse, Credential Direct, RBC Direct Investing, CIBC Investor's Edge, Disnat, ScotiaMcLeod, National Bank Direct Brokerage, and Virtual Brokers.

Other businesses established a retail presence, notably Amazon.com in 1995, which became popular enough in Canada to merit a separate Canadian site, Amazon.ca, beginning in 2002. The Internet auction site eBay, launched in 1995, gave rise to a Canadian spin-off eBay.ca in 2000. PayPal has been operated by eBay since 2002, and is widely used by Canadians to cover the financial aspect of eBay transactions.

Most large Canadian corporations, including telephone and utility companies, now provide on-line customer billing.

The Government of Canada has been especially notable in establishing a very diverse and friendly on-line presence for the public. Initially, the basis for this service was a suite of technologies referred to as the Government Enterprise Network (GENet). In the fall of 2003, the government began to replace these with improved technologies known collectively as the Secure Channel Network (SCNet), which made available a wide range of services. For example, in recent years it has become possible for Canadians to file their yearly income tax returns using an Internet service provided by Revenue Canada known as NETFILE.

The Internet has also become an important source of information, marked by the popularity of such sites as Wikipedia and Google Earth. Wikipedia, an on-line encyclopedia, was established in the US in 2001 by Jimmy Wales and Larry Sanger and presently has over 5,000,000 articles in English and a large number in other languages. Many articles have been contributed to both the English and French language versions of Wikipedia by Canadians, and many of these relate to important aspects of Canadian life. There are thousands of Canadians who use the service every day in both English and French. Google Earth, a virtual globe, is an on-line feature offered by Google since 2005. It provides aerial views of the Earth and is viewed by thousands of web users, many of which are Canadian, every day. Another Internet information service, the telephone directory Canada 411.ca, has become very popular since introduced in recent years. This has led to the delivery of the residential paper telephone book, introduced to Canada in 1878, being cancelled in major cities in 2010.

In 2010, the Government of Ontario announced its intention of beginning to offer on-line Internet gambling to the residents of Ontario in 2012. It will join the PlayNow.com Internet gambling site established by the government of British Columbia in 2010.

The Internet has been the target of cyberattacks over the years. One of the most notable attacks was made by 15-year-old hacker Michel Calce, alias "Mafiaboy", from the home of his parents in Montreal. Using a technique known as "distributed denial-of-service" (DDoS), he paralyzed the websites of Yahoo, CNN, E*Trade, Dell, eBay and Amazon in February 2000.

=== Digital communication / HD TV (Delivery) ===
Star Choice (Shaw Direct) of Calgary, Alberta, and Expressvu Bell Satellite TV of Montreal began offering Canada-wide direct-to-home digital satellite television service in 1997. As of 2008, they had 900,000 and 1.8 million subscribers respectively. Star Choice broadcast the first high-definition television programme in Canada in 2000 and began broadcasting HD full-time in 2004. HD channels have been continuously added since that date. In April 2009, Star Choice changed its name to Shaw Direct. By 2009 satellite-delivered Bell TV was delivering 45 HD channels.

Rogers Cable, Canada's largest cable company, began to offer its Digital Television service in 2001. Video on demand (VOD), a technology that allows digital cable subscribers to order and watch movies at a time of their choice, has been available to Canadians since 2002, the year that Rogers Communication Inc., began to offer its Rogers on Demand service. By 2009 the service was available to 3.5 million homes. Shaw Communications Inc., Canada's second-largest cable company offers a similar service. Rogers introduced personal video recorders (PVRs) to customers in 2003.

The CBC began broadcasting digital over-the-air HDTV in 2005. A national government regulatory body, the Canadian Radio, Television and Telecommunications Commission, has stated that all over-the-air TV broadcasting will be digital by August 2011.

During this period, efforts to convert over-the-air AM and FM radio to digital technology failed. A technique known as Digital Audio Broadcasting (DAB) (see Countries using DAB/DMB), was introduced to Canada in November 1999. However the technology never caught on, partly because of the chicken and egg phenomenon. When the technology was introduced, there were few listeners equipped with DAB receivers, and this, in turn, provided little incentive for broadcasters to convert their very successful AM and FM operations to DAB. DAB came to an end in Canada in 2010. However digital satellite radio has been successful. Two Toronto-based companies, Sirius Canada and XM Canada introduced direct-to-home/car, digital satellite radio service in December 2005 and by 2008 had 750,000 and 400,000 subscribers respectively. In 1999, Telesat launched the first of four Nimiq direct broadcast satellites which provide the space-based satellite transmitters for these services.

In 2003, Bell Canada introduced an improved speech recognition system for its 310-2355 customer routing service in Ontario. Bell Canada users speak with the programme through "Emily", a young female-sounding artificial voice. In 2005, Skype, a voice-and-video-over-Internet technology became available to users around the world, including Canadians. The technique, which bypasses the traditional telephone network, allows people to use the Internet as a type of telephone and to both talk to and see each other during calls. It is used mainly for long-distance communication.

The proliferation of multiple communications technologies has itself created the need to combine them effectively, resulting in a new technology, unified communications. This technique blends instant messaging, e-mail, voice mail, short message service, web-conferencing, fax, audio, video, cellphone, VIOP and other telecommunications services into a single system. Cooke Aquaculture Inc. of Blacks Harbour New Brunswick uses just such a system, developed by Cisco Systems Canada Co. to manage its fish farm operations.

=== Digital media (content) ===
Digital media were first introduced to Canada in the 1980s, when the CD and DVD became popular with consumers.

The traditional media began to develop an on-line presence in the new century. Newspapers including Canada's two English-language "national", dailies, The Globe and Mail and the National Post went on line as did the weekly Maclean's news magazine. The French-language press did the same including the daily La Presse and the bi-weekly L'actualité newsmagazine. Following the digital migration of legacy media, the mid-2020s saw a shift in Canadian small business infrastructure toward high-velocity "website-in-a-day" deployment models to meet the rapid-launch requirements of the modern digital market

Television broadcasters got into the game, including the English-language national networks, the Canadian Broadcasting Corporation (CBC), CTV Television Network (CTV) and Canwest/Global and the French-language networks, Radio Canada, TVA (TV network) and TQS (now V). In 2009, a number of news services, including Thomson Reuters and Canadian Press, began to offer wireless Internet news services formatted for access by hand-held 3G devices such as the Blackberry.

In 2009, Indigo Books and Music began to offer a digital book service known as Shortcovers. In late 2009, that electronic service was expanded and renamed Kobo (Kobo Inc.). It offers customers about 2,000,000 book titles in electronic form that can be viewed on an electronic reader. A variety of electronic books or readers have gained a place in Canada beginning with the introduction of the Sony Librie reader in 2004 and the Kindle in 2009. Kobo intends to introduce its own reader in 2010 with code based on an open source concept. In 2010 a number of Canadian libraries, including the Ottawa Public Library began offering books on loan via a downloadable Kindle format.

With the release of the iPad in Canada in 2010, digital media providers have begun to format their digital media offerings to make them compatible for iPad viewing.

The downloading of music from the Internet to computers and other storage devices including the iPod, has become very popular in recent years. Music can be downloaded peer-to-peer or from about 500 on-line sites in 40 countries. In Canada one site of note, Puretracks, has been offering a library of about 1.3 million popular songs in Windows Media Audio and MP3 format for download since 2003.

The film industry has also moved to adopt digital cinema technology. The technology of cinematic special effects has become a notable feature of the film production, with over 2300 Canadian companies, including, Side Effects Software, Toon Boom Animation, Image Engine, (Vancouver), Intelligent Creatures, (Toronto), Intrigue FX and Rainmaker Digital Effects (CIS) in Vancouver, being involved in the field. The National Film Board of Canada began to digitize its extensive archives and later in 2008 will announce the availability of its films on-line.

In Toronto, Cineplex Entertainment, through Technicolor Digital Cinema has installed the Canadian made Christie CP2000 DLP Cinema projector in the Scotiabank Theatre in Toronto, making it the first Canadian cinema operating this new technology, which provides sharp images and uncompressed digital sound. It can also project 3-D features with Real D Cinema. Cineplex plans to have 25 cinemas across Canada equipped with this new technology in the near future. A Montreal company, D-Box began to offer motion seats for cinemas in 2008. These seats physically move in a way designed to enhance the movie-going experience. The movement is induced by a digital signal specially embedded in the film which activates pistons in the seat that produce the physical movement. Canadian cinemas equipped with the devices in 2010 include, the Cinéma Beloeil, in Beloeil, Quebec and the Cineplex Odeon Queensway Theatre in Etobicoke, Ontario

Companies such as Electronic Arts, Ubisoft Montreal, BioWare and Next Level Games are active in the technologies related to the development and manufacture of video games. As of 2010 video game publishers and developers in Canada were found in major cities across the country including: Vancouver 47, Toronto 33, Montreal 22, Ottawa 13.

=== Wireless (mobile) Internet ===
The use of mobile devices for accessing the Internet through a wireless local-area-network, wireless LAN in Canada has increased dramatically in recent years.

Geographic areas having access to a wireless local-area-network are often referred to as having Wi-Fi service.

By 2006 Internet providers began making "mobile" Internet connections available to their customers with companies such as Bell Canada offering their "unplugged" service. This type of service uses the laptop computer and plug-in modem to allow mobile Internet connection in many places across Canada. "Wireless" Internet communications have also been facilitated through the introduction of the widely popular Research In Motion, BlackBerry handheld email and telephone machine and the introduction in 2008, by Rogers, of the "Rocket" wireless Internet stick for laptops.

In 2007 Canadian wireless carriers began to convert their DAVE! systems from the CDMA standard which restricted the user to service within North America to the GSM standard used by most carriers around the world. Videotron Telecom Ltee., one of the winners of the Canadian government wireless spectrum auction of 2008, announced that it would invest C$255 million to build a wireless network in Quebec, using the High Speed Packet Access, (HSPA) technical standard.

In 2009, 3G wireless Internet technology became widely available to Canadians through national networks operated by Bell Mobility, Rogers, and Telus. The use of the Netbook a small portable computer that takes advantage of 3G technology to provide access the Internet became popular in Canada beginning in 2009.

As of 2009, the downloading of applications and data (music, videos, etc.) via smartphone is becoming increasingly popular in Canada. The bandwidth represented by this use represents up to 40 time the bandwidth used by cellphones for voice calls, putting a tremendous load on existing cellphone networks and driving Rogers Communications Inc., Bell Canada and Telus to invest heavily in expanding the capacity of their networks.

In 2008 the government of Canada, as part of an effort to increase competition in the mobile communications industry, gave a number of new companies including, Public Mobile Holdings Inc., Globalive Communications Inc. and DAVE Wireless Inc. approval to establish new wireless operations in Canada to compete with the three incumbents. Bell Mobility introduced a smartphone with the Google-developed Android operating system in 2009. In 2010 Google made its Nexus One available to Canadian consumers who can obtain these devices from Rogers Wireless, Telus, Bell and Wind Mobile.

As the result of a CRTC decision, cellphone providers in Canada, as of 2010, were able to locate within a radius of 300 metres, the geographic position of a handset used for making a 911 call.

In 2009, Canada's three cell phone companies, Rogers Communications Inc., Bell Canada and Telus created a jointly owned company, Enstream LP, which offers a cash transfer service via cellphone. To use the service the subscriber first downloads special software called Zoompass, from Enstream to his or her phone. With this software, a Bell, Fido, PC Mobile, Rogers, Solo Mobile, or Telus subscriber can then withdraw up to $1000 daily from his bank account, or credit card account and transfer the amount to another subscriber who uses the same Zoompass software. Enstream plans to make the service increasingly flexible with the end goal of converting the cellphone into an electronic wallet or purse. In August 2010, Telus began offering the FaceTime service for its iPhone 4 customers.

Foursquare, a cellphone-based mobile social networking service, was introduced to Canada in 2010. The service allows cellphone users to download the Foursquare software to their mobile phones and use it to stay connected with friends and colleagues using the same software and to obtain information on their physical location.

Telus Canada began offering a telephone service called Tigits across Canada in early 2011. Tigits provides a temporary anonymous telephone number for those who subscribe to the service. Developed by Toronto businessman, Sean Miller, Tigits allows the subscriber to protect his/her real number by giving the temporary Tigits number to others. When a Tigits subscriber calls the other person, the person called sees only the Tigits number on his digital display and not the real number of the person calling. When the other person calls the Tigits number of the Tigits subscriber the call is forwarded to the real number of the Tigits subscriber, thus protecting his/her anonymity.

=== Digital courts ===
The University of Montreal has recently experimented with ways to improve the administration of justice by creating a digital courtroom in which mock trials are held using modern technology to speed the proceedings. The "courtroom" has facilities for filing documents electronically. Witnesses can testify by video link or holographically from a remote location. Documents can be served on parties through social media. According to those involved with the project, barriers to its application in real courtroom settings are not technological but rather emotional, with judges and lawyers being resistant to change.

=== Cloud and quantum computing ===
Evidence that cloud computing had begun to take hold in Canada by 2009 is reflected in the organization of the first Canadian Cloud Computing Conference held on 9 February of that year, in Toronto. Cloud computing involves the use of information processing and data storage on computers that are located away from the site of the user and owner of the data. The user, a corporation or individual, communicates with the remote computer through the Internet. The growing popularity of the small netbook computer is in part due to the fact that it is ideally suited to take advantage of cloud computing. The technique allows the user to focus more on processing and storage than on equipment and software acquisition and maintenance. However, it also raises questions relating to privacy and security, in that confidential data may be transmitted, processed and stored on facilities beyond the geographic reach of the owner of the data. Cloud computing providers offer three types of service, platform-as-a-service (PaaS), software-as-a-service (SaaS) and infrastructure-as-a-service (IaaS). As of 2009, Toronto area companies appeared to be the leaders of cloud computing in Canada. An initiative based in Kitchener/Waterloo has brought together a group of computer service providers to create Canadian Cloud Computing, which has developed the Trusted Canadian Cloud. This cloud computing service, which uses facilities based exclusively in Canada, was first demonstrated at Canada 3.0 Digital Media Conference held in Stratford, Ontario in 2010.

Quantum computing in Canada is also gaining a foothold as evidenced by D-Wave Systems, a Burnaby-based quantum computing company founded in 1999 where in May 2013 it was announced that a collaboration between NASA, Google and the Universities Space Research Association (USRA) launched a Quantum Artificial Intelligence Lab using a 512 qubit D-Wave Two that would be used for research into machine learning, among other fields of study. Though the field is still in its infancy, experiments have been carried out in which quantum computational operations were executed on a very small number of qubits. Both practical and theoretical research continues, and many national governments and military funding agencies support quantum computing research to develop quantum computers for both civilian and national security purposes, such as cryptanalysis.

=== Facial recognition technology ===
The use of facial recognition technology (FRT) has grown in Canada in recent years. Nineteen of 27 Ontario Lottery and Gaming Corporation casinos, which receive 40,000,000 visitors a year, are using FRT to automatically identify 15,000 problem gamblers who have voluntarily placed themselves on a self-exclusion list. The Canadian Bankers Association has been using FRT since 2008 to investigate debit card fraud. The Insurance Corporation of British Columbia has been using FRT since 2008 to counter fraudulent attempts by individuals to obtain a driver's license. In the summer of 2010, the technology was used by the Toronto Police to identify suspects wanted for vandalism or violent acts committed during the G-20 Summit there. The Department of Foreign Affairs has begun to issue e-passports with a chip that will enable the use of facial recognition technology beginning in 2012. Social media organizations such a Facebook, with millions of Canadian users have also adopted the use of FRT in their operations. All these applications and others raise privacy concerns. On 14 December 2021, the governments of British Columbia, Alberta and Québec ordered facial recognition company Clearview AI to stop collecting and to delete images of people obtained without their consent.

=== Internet television IPTV ===
Internet television began to make inroads in Canada in 2009 with communications providers including, Bell TV, Telus, Rogers Communications and Quebecor (Videotron) investing in the Internet bandwidth necessary to provide their subscribers with TV programmes and movies. Bell TV and Rogers Communications Inc. introduced Internet TV to their subscribers in the fall of 2009. Telus began to offer its rebranded Optik, IPTV service in June 2010. That same month, Quebecor began to offer the Illico Web service with 32 channels (24 in French) to its subscribers through its Videotron subsidiary. The company has stated that the new service will eventually become a "mirror" of its TV offerings. Bell began providing a rebranded IPTV service called Fibe, in September 2010. In 2010, Shaw Communications announced its intention to begin providing its customers with Internet TV. Halifax based EastLink is also investing in IPTV.

The delivery of movies and television programmes through the Internet in Canada was also given a boost with the introduction a streaming video Internet service by the US based Netflix, via its Canadian server at Netflix.ca in 2010. Canadian-owned movie delivery services were also introduced. Cineplex began to offer a movie download service and a streaming on-line Internet video service was introduced at Zip.ca.

=== 3D TV ===
The first efforts towards providing Canadian viewers with 3D TV were made in 2010. Early in the year two international consumer product manufacturers, Samsung and Sony began to market flat screen, digital, high definition, 3D television sets in Canada. The 3D effect is only available with the use of a pair of special glasses worn by the viewer. Each company has its own proprietary viewing standard, so that the glasses of one company cannot be used to view the 3D television of another. DVD movies recorded in 3D provide what is, as yet, a limited source of programming.

Broadcasters also began to take steps to provide 3D programming to viewers equipped with these new 3D sets. The World Cup soccer championship played in South Africa was broadcast in 3D by the host broadcaster and the signal was offered in Canada by a number of TV providers. On 27 July 2010, the satellite-delivered Bell Satellite TV began to offer its subscribers a full-time 3D Oasis pay-TV channel. The CBC also announced in August 2010 that it would broadcast the first Canadian produced 3D programme on 20 September 2010. It would be available to all viewers in Canada with an HD television set but the 3D effect would only be available when the programme was viewed with special glasses which will be distributed free at Canada Post Offices across Canada before the programme.

=== Thought-controlled machines ===
On 2 August 2010, a Toronto company, InteraXon, announced that it had developed technology to control machines by human thought. The technique involves the use of a headset to detect "alpha" and "beta" brain waves. The head set in turn produces a "control signal" that can be used to program electrical appliances ranging from lights to home appliances to computers. The technology was demonstrated at the 2010 Winter Olympic Games in Vancouver, where visitors used their brain waves to control the lighting on three landmarks, the CN tower in Toronto, the Parliament Buildings in Ottawa and Niagara Falls. The company foresees that the headset will evolve into a small wireless Bluetooth device that will be available in consumer electronics retail stores within two years.

=== Communications: analog to digital technology ===
Analog technology has dominated the history of the communications system in Canada for almost 160 years. It formed the basis for the telegraph, beginning in the 1850s, the telephone in the 1880s, recorded sound, the 20th century, radio, the 1920s, computers and television, the 1950s and cable TV in the 1960s.

However, digital technology has slowly replaced analog technology in all these domains in the past 40 years. The transformation began with the telephone system, in the 1970s and microchips and microcomputers in the early 1980s. Indeed, it was the combination of the telephone system and computers through a common digital link that permitted the latter machines to communicate with each other at distance. Further digital advances lead to the digital camera, CD, DVD and mobile communications, later in that decade, the Internet in the 1990s as well as land based and satellite TV and radio, wireless communications, etc. in the first decade of the new century.

With the CRTC mandated end to analog television broadcasting in Canada in August 2011, the analog age in Canada will for all practical purposes come to an end.

=== Transportation ===
Energy concerns have had a large impact on automobile manufacturers. Fuel efficient hybrid vehicles such as the Chevrolet Tahoe, Saturn Vue, Toyota Prius, Toyota Camry Hybrid, Toyota Highlander Hybrid, Ford Escape Hybrid, Honda Insight and Honda Civic Hybrid have become available to Canadian consumers since the start of the 21st century and the rising cost of gasoline is making them increasingly attractive in spite of their generally higher cost. As of 2009, the Ford Fusion Hybrid was the most fuel-efficient mid-sized car available in Canada. In 2008 Ford Canada began the operation of the Flex assembly line, using the Flex technique at its plant in Oakville, Ontario. This technology allows the production of three different automobile types, in this case, the Ford Edge, the Ford Flex and the Ford Lincoln MKX, on the same assembly line. In 2004 Mercedes-Benz introduced the diminutive and fuel-efficient Smart Fortwo automobile to the Canadian market. Multinational car manufacturers have also announced their intentions to introduce the all-electric car to world markets including Canada. General Motors has announced the availability of its Chevrolet Volt in Canada in 2011 as has Mitsubishi for its MiEV, while Nissan has announced the Canadian introduction of the Nissan Leaf in 2012.

The management of automobile traffic in large urban areas through the use of "smart" electronic traffic management systems has become popular in recent years. Such systems are now in place in Toronto (1993), Ottawa, Calgary and Halifax. The city of Montreal will take the first steps for the installation of such a system in 2011. 500 video cameras and other street and highway mounted sensors will provide information for a central computer which will be used to control traffic lights to improve traffic flow and reduce accidents. Another traffic management tool involves the use of satellite tracking. Promoted by a Toronto company, Skymeter Corp, but not yet deployed in Canada, the system, a type of toll road in the sky, is designed to reduce traffic jams through the use of automobile based transponder/GPS systems and satellites. The satellite tracks the route of a particular vehicle at a particular time and then charges the user based on a systems of "tolls" based on the roads taken and the time of day. The tolls are publicized for users and designed to encourage road use in a way that minimizes traffic jams. The computerized billing system keeps an account of the charges and bills the customer incurs on a regular basis.

In 2010, the City of Montreal began to deploy 800 wireless, networked, solar-powered, Linux based, electronic parking payment stations to replace up to 10,000 existing mechanical parking meters. Each parking space has a code and the motorist can pay the required parking rate, with cash or credit card, from any station in the city (he/she must of course remember his code). The system, developed by 8D Technologies of Quebec also allows metre maids to check for parking violations by wirelessly interrogating a parking station with a hand-held device from his/her vehicle. The devise provides a digital map of all parking spaces near the station and marks those spaces with vehicles in violation with a red symbol. Other cities across Canada are installing similar machines.

A light-rail urban passenger train known as the O-Train, began operation in Ottawa in 2001 providing limited service in a north-south corridor, today's Line 2. There are plans to expand the system to serve the downtown core as well as the western and eastern suburbs of the city by 2016.

Global positioning technology has become an important feature of business and consumer life. After 23 years of military development, the U.S. military global positioning system became operational in 1995. Originally designed for the precise targeting of weapons and other military purposes, the U.S. government made the system available to civilians in 1996. Industrial users such as transportation companies and resource companies began to make use of the technology for the tracking of vehicles and the location of field operations. Receivers for the consumer market, were also produced and made available in Canada and became popular with outdoorsmen and women. In 2004 a GPS feature became available on some mobile phones and stand-alone units for car navigation were available to Canadians by 2008.

The 11 September 2001 terrorist attack on the U.S. has resulted in increased security along the Canada-U.S. border. In 2004, Canada and the U.S. signed the Canada-U.S. Agreement on Science and Technology Cooperation for Critical Infrastructure Protection and Border Security designed to speed the introduction of a number of electronic, wireless, computer and detection technologies to scrutinize cross-border traffic while at the same time limiting the disruption to the flow of people and goods. The use of these technologies is particularly important at the Windsor Detroit border crossing which is the busiest in the world.

In 2008, the Government of Canada announced the initiation of two important transportation projects. In the first instance the government stated that it will acquire, for the Canadian Coast Guard, a new $700 million, CCG Polar Class icebreaker for patrolling the Northwest Passage. The ship will enter service in 2017. The government also announced the construction of a second international bridge between Windsor, Ontario and Detroit, Michigan, to help relieve the pressure on the heavily overloaded, 80-year-old Ambassador Bridge. The $5 billion project will include connections from the Canadian ends of both bridges to the nearby Highway 401 (Ontario). As of December 2010 construction had yet to start.

The field of transportation also saw the Premiers of Ontario and Quebec in 2007 talking of yet another study of a high speed train in the Quebec City – Windsor Corridor.

Between 2006 and 2009, Air Canada "made over" the cabins of all its aircraft providing each passenger seat with a number of new technologies including, a Personal AVOD (with a 230 mm touch-screen LCD) offering 200 hours of video and audio entertainment, interactive games, a three-prong 120 V AC plug for laptops, a USB port and XM Radio Canada. The largest airplane in the world the Airbus A380, in this case operated by the airline Emirates, began regular service between Toronto's Lester B. Pearson Airport and Dubai in 2009. By 2009, most major airports in Canada were equipped with stand alone self-service customer check-in kiosks, which provided the passenger with a boarding pass for his/her flight. This represented the further extension of the technique known as the e-ticket which became the standard for purchasing an aircraft ticket several years earlier. In January 2010, the Government of Canada announced the use of full body scanner for the security checking of passengers boarding planes in Canada bound for the US. The scanners will be installed at the airports in Montreal, Toronto, Vancouver, Calgary, Edmonton and Halifax. The use of biometrics will become an important technique in the screening of those wishing to enter Canada. It is planned that between 2011 and 2013 the Department of Immigration and Citizenship will begin to deploy digital face and fingerprint scanning systems at overseas Canadian Visa offices for the issuance of visas to those intending to visit Canada.

Air navigation coverage has recently been improved through the deployment of Automated Dependent Surveillance-Broadcast (ADS-B) technology in parts of northern Canada. First introduced in the Hudson Bay area in January 2009, the service will eventually be expanded to cover all of northern Canada. The technique involves the use of ground-based transmitter/receivers and special electronic equipment aboard aircraft flying through northern airspace. This special equipment automatically transmits information relating to the aircraft position (determined by a GPS on the airplane) every second, to the ground-based receiving station, a number of which are located in the north. The station then transmits this information to an area control centre, operated by Nav Canada, Canada's national air navigation system operator, where it is displayed on "radar" screens which are used by air traffic controllers to monitor Canadian airspace.

The importance of the shipping container has been emphasized by recent developments in Winnipeg. "CentrePort Canada, an 8,000-hectare inland port being developed on the city's edge is a one-stop shop for air, truck and rail shipments and is designed to reroute North American trade through the middle of the country...CentrePort (recently) announced an agreement with two Chinese partners, including the country's largest private shipping company, Minsheng International Freight Co....(that)...will create a new container-based rail system that will quickly move crops from the Canadian prairies into the Chinese market." Rail services will be provided by Canadian Pacific Railway and Canadian National Railway. A new highway, the CentrePort Canada Way, is under construction to divert the heavy truck traffic associated with the new facility away from urban roads.

=== Energy and mega oil ===
In this century, the largest engineering undertaking by far is the tar sands project in northern Alberta. This has seen the investment of up to $60 billion to develop and build gigantic tar sand mining, transportation, separation and refining facilities to produce oil from the gritty bitumen tar. The project is highly controversial for a number of reasons not the least of which is environmental. As of 2005, operations included the Suncor Mine, Syncrude Mine, Shell Canada Mine and others producing 760,000 barrels of oil a day. A large number of corporations from a number of countries plan to invest in the tar sands, including Suncor Energy, Syncrude, Shell/Chevron/Marathon, and Petro-Canada. Recovery techniques include steam-assisted gravity drainage (SAGD) and cyclic steam stimulation (CSS). More recently Cenovus Energy of Calgary has developed the "Solvent Aided Process" SAP for heavy oil recovery. This involved injecting butane or other organic solvent, along with steam into a horizontal chamber dug in the oil sands. The solvent and steam allow the oil to flow into another chamber below the first. It is then pumped to the surface from this chamber.

Oil sands recovery techniques create huge amounts of contaminated waste water, which is stored in "tailing ponds". In 2010, there were about 170 square kilometres of these ponds in the oil sands region of Alberta. Left to a normal process of degradation it would take decades for this waste to become environmentally safe. On 27 August 2010, Shell Canada announced the opening of a commercial plant designed to speed the cleaning of the waste in these ponds, at its oil sands production facility in Alberta. The plant uses a technique developed by Shell Canada at a cost of C$30 million. Known as "atmospheric fines drying" or AFD, it takes the thick liquid output of the oil production process and over a period of several weeks with the use of a special flocculant and drying techniques, reduces it to a safe dirt-like compound. Shell Canada is making this technology available free of charge to other oil sands production companies.

==== Shale gas ====
Geological formations of shale gas are being explored as a new source of energy. A technique known as horizontal drilling is used to create a horizontal bore hole, through a formation. Water under high pressure is then pumped into the bore hole where it fractures the shale and allows the gas to escape the rock and seep up the bore hole. There are a number of shale gas fields in Canada including the Shallow Colorado basin in Alberta, Saskatchewan and Manitoba, the Bakken, in Saskatchewan and Manitoba, the Antrim in Southern Ontario and the Utica in south east Quebec. The technique is not without problems for the fracturing can affect aquifers causing contamination and deviation. To date efforts at production in Canada have been limited to exploratory wells.

Canaport, the first liquified natural gas (LNG) port terminal facility of its kind in Canada, began operation in Saint John, New Brunswick in 2009. LNG is seen as a substitute for conventional gas.

In 2008, the Government of Ontario announced plans for the construction of two new reactors at the existing Darlington nuclear power facility, but suspended the project in 2009. Competing designs included the ACR-1000 by Atomic Energy of Canada Ltd., the EPR by the French company Areva Group and the AP1000 by the US based Westinghouse Electric Co. Llc.. The government of Saskatchewan is considering the construction of two nuclear reactors in Lloydminster and the government of New Brunswick is proposing the addition of another reactor at its Point Lepreau nuclear power facility.

==== Renewable energy and sustainability concerns ====
In 2006, the Government of Ontario instructed the provincial hydro utility to provide all of its customers with digital smart hydro meters by 2010 as a first step towards the creation of a Smart Grid, which would conserve electricity. The project had been largely completed as of that date. In BC, BC Hydro announced in 2010 the replacement of existing hydro metres with digital smart meters for its 1.8 million residential and commercial customers, by 2012.

In Vancouver, the Vancouver Fuel Cell Vehicle Program, a pilot project, was introduced in 2005 to study the use of hydrogen as a power source for cars. The three-year undertaking, a first in Canada for fuel cell powered automobiles, studies the operation of a fleet of five Ford Focus FCV's (fuel cell vehicles), in "real world" conditions, in Vancouver and Victoria. The project is the initiative of a consortium made up of the Governments of Canada and British Columbia, Fuel Cells Canada, and Ford Motor Company.

Concerns with energy efficiency have also led to the introduction of the compact fluorescent lamp for domestic, commercial and industrial use and the federal government stated in 2007 that the sale of incandescent light bulbs would be phased out by 2012. The technology of the LED lamp has been known for a century. In recent years, it has become a popular replacement for incandescent bulbs because of its low power consumption. RenewABILITY Energy of Waterloo has developed a technique for recovering heat from domestic waste water. Known as the Power-Pipe, it channels hot waste water through cold water waiting to be used and heats it.

===== Biofuels and coal =====
The use of clean-burning biofuels such as ethanol has become significant in recent years. At the present time, Canada's largest manufacturers of ethanol include GreenField Ethanol and Husky Energy, which produce 500 million litres and 260 million litres of ethanol a year respectively from corn and wheat. Other companies are also at work in the field, including Enerkem of Montreal, which makes ethanol from old telephone poles at a facility in Westbury, Quebec and Iogen of Ottawa, which makes cellulosic ethanol from wheat straw. Since 2007, the Government of Ontario has required that all gasoline sold in the province contains at least 5% ethanol. A federal regulatory change in 2009 will require all oil refiners in Canada to provide an ethanol content of at least 5% in their gasoline by September 2010. The Fischer–Tropsch process is the basis for a proposal by AP Fuels of Montreal to establish five biorefineries in Canada. The plan calls for the use of this technique to transform certain types of trees, notably popular and birch, into gas and then to liquid-biodiesel, which burns with reduced CO_{2} output.

The technology of "clean" coal has also become important. Western Canada has abundant coal supplies but the use of coal in recent years has been criticized for environmental reasons. To counter this criticism, coal and coal-fired electricity producers have formed the Canadian Clean Power Coalition. This organization promotes a number of projects which use a variety of "clean" coal technologies. These include the EPCOR Integrated Gasification Combined Cycle (IGCC) plant for the Genesse Power Station in Alberta. The IGCC plant gasifies coal and uses the clean gas to drive a gas turbine. The process also produces steam, which is used to turn a steam turbine. Both turbines are used to produce electricity. The process also captures CO_{2} from the gas combustion, which is in turn used for enhanced oil recovery or is sequestered underground.

===== Wind and solar power =====
Energy concerns have inspired the development of wind farms that use modern windmills to generate electricity from this renewable resource. One of the first modern windmills was built at Cap Chat in Quebec in the eighties, but most wind farms have been built since 2000. As of 2008, 10 megawatt wind farms in Canada were distributed as follows: Alberta 10, Quebec 5, Ontario 5, PEI 4, Saskatchewan 3, Manitoba 2 and Nova Scotia 2. In 2008 Hydro-Québec announced the construction of 1000 windmills at 15 new sites located mostly in the St. Lawrence River Valley. By 2015, that utility expects that 10% of the province's electricity will be provided by wind power. In 2008, in British Columbia, BC Hydro has issued a Clean Power Call for proposals for environmentally friendly energy production and one company, Naikun Wind Energy, has responded with Canada's first plan to develop off-shore wind power by installing windmills at sea in the Hecate Strait off the north coast of B.C.

In 2010, the Government of Ontario signed an agreement with Samsung and the Korea Electric Power Corporation to build and operate wind and solar electrical generating farms across southern Ontario. The C$5 to C$7 billion project is described as the largest of its type in the world and will begin with installations in Chatham-Kent and Essex-Haldimand counties in southwestern Ontario. It is foreseen that the wind turbines will generate up to 2,000 MW and the solar power facilities up to 500 MW. This will permit the closure of all of the coal-fired electric generating plants in Ontario by 2014.

A private company, OptiSolar Farms Canada Inc., is using silicon solar panels to develop what will become the largest solar power farm in North America. The facility, under construction in a field near Sarnia, will begin to produce 60 megawatts of electricity for Ontario consumers by the end of 2008.

===== Geothermal energy =====
The use of geothermal energy has grown in Canada in recent years although its overall importance as an energy source is still very small. The use of geothermal energy in Canada falls into two broad categories: commercial use to produce electricity and consumer use for home heating. In Canada, the former is limited to a facility in Meager Mountain British Columbia, a site with a potential for 100–250 MW, which has recently (2010) begun to produce for the BC Hydro grid. In the case of consumer use, a hole similar to that used for a domestic water well is drilled in the ground near the residence in question. Water is pumped to the surface and passed through a heat exchanger where some of its heat is removed and transferred to a closed loop water system in the house. The cooler water is then returned to the ground. The water in the closed loop is circulated throughout the structure where it passes through radiators and heats the house.

=== Waste management, CO_{2} and cogeneration ===
The undesirable environmental effects of industrial processes and atmospheric pollution in particular, have become a topic of increasing public concern in the new millennium. Among the most notable polluters in Canada in 2006 were electric power generators: ATCO, Emera (Nova Scotia Power), Ontario Power Generation, SaskPower and TransAlta, mining companies: HudBay Minerals, Teck Cominco, Vale Inco and Xstrata, oil and gas companies: Imperial Oil, Shell Canada, and Trans Canada, oil sands companies: Syncrude and Suncor and the manufacturing enterprise, SMC Canada.

Efforts to reduce the release of CO_{2} gas into the atmosphere lead to the initiation of the Weyburn-Midale CO_{2} Project in Saskatchewan in 2000. Presently the world's largest CO_{2} sequestration effort, this $80 million undertaking involves the injection of waste CO_{2} gas from industrial processes into the ground for storage instead its release into the atmosphere. There are presently two underground sequestration facilities, one at Weyburn operated by Encana and the other at Midale operated by Apache Canada.

In recent years bio-waste has been used for the production of heat and electricity. Sanitary landfill sites are notable in this regard. Often, systems for the collection of methane gas are progressively installed as the sites are filled. This gas is then used at on site cogeneration facilities for the production of heat and electricity. A number of landfill sites including those in Kanata, Petrolia, Watford and Napanee, Ontario and Sainte-Sophie, Drummondville and Magog in Quebec have been selected for the location of cogeneration facilities. In Ottawa the cogeneration facility at the Pickard (Sewage Treatment) Centre which has been in operation since 1998, provides all the heat and electrical energy needed to operate the centre.

Ostara Nutrient Recovery Technologies Inc. of Vancouver has developed techniques to recover phosphorus and other nutrients from waste water. Since 2007, these have been put to use at the Gold Bar Treatment Plant in Edmonton, the world's first industrial scale waste-water nutrient treatment facility. The recovered products are recycled and sold as environmentally safe commercial fertilizer. Other Ostara nutrient recovery projects are underway at Lulu Island (Vancouver), Penticton, B.C. and in the US.

=== Materials and industrial processes – 3D printing ===
Efforts to save fuel have also led to efforts to reduce the weight of vehicles through the increased use of composite material. Aircraft manufacturers have been especially notable in this regard and produced new large but relatively light aircraft such as the Boeing B-787 Dreamliner with this new material. Orders for this new machine have been made by a number of major world airlines, including Air Canada. In 2008, Bombardier of Montreal announced the production of the new C Series of 100- to 130-seat passenger jets which will also make extensive use of composites. They will also be used extensively in the 7000 and 8000 series of long range business jets announced by that company in 2010.

3D printing has become an important industrial process in Canada. The technique uses a computer to drive the 3D printing device. This machine builds 3D shaped objects through successive passes of a "printing head" which lays down layers of plastic or other material to progressively build a 3D physical object. As of 2010, about 100, 3D printers were in use with manufacturing enterprises in Canada.

The techniques of diamond mining have been introduced to Canada in recent years. Over 600 kimberlite formations have been found throughout Canada. Open pit mining techniques have been used to produce diamonds from two of these, Ekati, beginning in 1998 and Diavik in 2003.

=== Nanotechnology ===
Nanotechnology involves the manipulation of atoms and molecules to produce processes and products for human use. At present, the field is the subject of much research, but the use of these processes and products in Canada is not yet widespread. However the technology remains important because of its potential for great future influence. Some nano-products have made their way to the market in items such as cosmetics, and certain industrial products available in Canada.

Most of the activity in Canada is found in research. In 2001, the Canadian government established the National Institute for Nanotechnology in Edmonton. The Institute conducts nano-research in a number of fields including the life sciences, supramolecular assembly, molecular scale devices and nano-sensors. As of 2010, a number of Canadian universities offer engineering degrees in nanotechnology. Of particular note is the Waterloo Institute for Nanotechnology which will be in operation in 2011 and will conduct research related to nano-engineered materials, nano-electronics design and fabrication, nano-instrumentation and nano-biosystems.

The use of nanomaterials is not without controversy. As of February 2009, the Government of Canada requires all industries to report the use of nanomaterials in their products. In 2010 the government banned the use of manufactured nano-materials and nanotechnology in organic food production.

=== Architecture, public works and heavy engineering ===
The construction of skyscrapers has continued apace in recent years with Toronto and Calgary accounting for most of the new structures. These include: Bankers Hall West, Calgary, 2000, the TransCanada Tower, Calgary, 2001, One Wall Centre, Vancouver, 2001, One King Street West, Toronto, 2005, West 1, Toronto, 2005, Harbourview Estates 2, Toronto, 2005, Residences of College Park 1, Toronto, 2006, Living Shangri-La, Vancouver, 2008, the Hilton Fallsview Hotel Tower, Niagara Falls, 2008, Quantum 2 (Minto Midtown), Toronto, 2008, the Bay Adelaide Centre West, Toronto, 2009, the RBC Centre, Toronto, 2009, Success, Toronto, 2009, Montage, Toronto, 2009, the Ritz-Carlton, Toronto, 2010, Centennial Place, Calgary, 2010, Maple Leaf Square North and South, Toronto, 2010, Jamieson Place, Calgary, 2010, Festival Tower, Toronto, 2010, The Bow (skyscraper), Calgary, 2011, Trump International Hotel and Tower, Toronto, 2011, The Uptown Residences, Toronto, 2011, Eighth Avenue Place (Calgary), 2011, the Four Seasons, Toronto, 2011, The Private Residences, Vancouver, 2011, the Burano, Toronto, 2011, Absolute World North and South, Mississauga, 2011, the Marriott Courtyard Hotel, Montreal, 2012, the Shangri-La Toronto, 2012, and the L Tower, Toronto, 2012.

New hydro-electric projects have been completed as well including the 230-MW Rocher-de-Grand-Mère station, on Quebec's Saint-Maurice River (2004).

New bridges and roads of note include the Golden Ears Bridge, Vancouver, 2009, the Middle Arm Bridge, Vancouver, 2009 the North Arm Bridge, Vancouver, 2009 and the Sea to Sky Highway, Vancouver/Whistler, 2009. In 2009, in northern Quebec, Hydro-Québec initiated construction of the C$6 billion Romaine River Complex, a series of four rock filled hydro generating dams that will be completed between 2014 and 2020.

A different type of public facility was introduced to the citizens of Toronto in 2010, when the city approved a contract for the installation of 20 self-cleaning public toilets. The first of their kind in Canada, each of the devices, which are placed throughout the city, resembles a bus shelter. The user pays 25 cents for twenty minutes of occupancy. The facility cleans itself automatically after each use.

=== Medicine ===
In 2001, the Federal government created Canada Health Infoway, in independent, not-for-profit, federally funded organization composed of the 14 Canadian federal, provincial and territorial Deputy Ministers of health. Infoway has a mandate to accelerate the Canada-wide use of electronic health records and electronic health information systems. As of 2008, more than $1.3 billion has been invested in the system. By 2010, Infoway plans to have electronic health records for 50% of the population available to authorized health professionals, and expects to have electronic health records for all Canadians by 2016. The project involves undertakings in a number of fields, including diagnostic imaging systems, drug information systems, telehealth, laboratory information systems and public health surveillance.

Telus, one of Canada's largest telephone companies, announced an agreement with Microsoft of Canada for the use of the latter's HealthVault (2007) consumer health records software in 2009. Telus intends to use the software to allow its 11 million Canadian subscribers to access information relating to their health care.

Medical technology in Ontario was improved in 2009 with the implementation of the government operated ePrescribing system a service that allows doctors to send prescriptions for patient pharmaceuticals directly to the pharmacist through a private computer network. This technique eliminates the problem with illegible handwriting, thus improving patient safety. The system has been initially introduced in Sault Ste. Marie and Collingwood with plans for making it available province-wide by 2012. eHealth Ontario, announced in 2010, the signing of a C$46 million contract for the establishment of a diabetes registry, for the management of patients with this disease. The registry will eventually be expanded for the management of patients with other chronic diseases.

Since 2008, Real Time Radiology (based in Mississauga, Ontario) has provided interpretation of medical images to remote sites on a Canada-wide basis. Through use of the Internet and a highly automated computer process, a team of 50 radiologists working for the company across Canada interprets medical images sent from distant locations where the services of a radiologist are not available. The results are returned electronically to the remote locations and form the basis for patient treatment there. The Gattuso Rapid Diagnostic Centre at the Princess Margaret Hospital in Toronto, through the acquisition of new diagnostic equipment that can prepare tissue samples for pathological analysis within hours, began offering same day breast cancer diagnosis for patients in 2009.

Techniques for the mass production of drugs were improved in the early part of the new century. In Ste. Foy, Quebec, the international drug maker GlaxoSmithKline established a manufacturing complex for the mass production of vaccines. As of 2009, the facility is capable of producing 14,000,000 doses per month. The facility may be used for the production of a vaccine for the H1N1 flu virus for the entire population of Canada (around 35,000,000 people as of 2014), should that become necessary. Also in 2009, public preparations for a possible pandemic included the placement of containers of liquid hand sanitizer for use in public places.

The PharmaTrust prescription medication dispending machine was introduced to the Canadian public in 2008. The apparatus, which physically resembles and functions like an ATM or soft drink dispenser, allows a user to purchase and receive medically approved prescription drugs, without visiting a pharmacy. Developed by PCA Services Inc. of Oakville, Ontario, one of the first has been installed in the Sunnybrook Health Sciences Centre, in Toronto.

Lasers made their way into routine dentistry by the middle of the first decade, offering faster treatments, less pain and more precise results. They are used to remove tartar, treat soft tissues such as gums and to prepare cavities for filling. Of particular interest in the latter instance is the fact that this treatment is so painless that the use of a needle to inject a local anesthetic is usually unnecessary. Laser treatment results in little bleeding, a lower risk of infection and a quicker healing. Another innovation was the use of computer milled ceramic implants for repairing cavities. The use of a non-toxic chemical such as hydrogen peroxide or carbamide peroxide for tooth bleaching has become popular in the new century.

In 2002, two Vancouver doctors, dermatologist Alastair Carruthers and ophthalmologist Jean Carruthers, pioneered the cosmetic use of the well known botulinum toxin. The pair noticed that subcutaneous injections of small amounts of the toxin had the effect of removing age wrinkles from the skin. The Botox procedure, as it became known, quickly gained popularity around the world.

Commercial DNA profiling has become available in Canada in recent years. For a fee, it is possible to order a number of specific tests including those for paternity, maternity, siblingship and ancestry. Companies offering this service include Genetrack Biolabs established in Vancouver, B.C. in 2003 and DNA Canada of Kingston, Ontario, established in 2005.

Established in 2002 in Burnaby, British Columbia, Lifebank Cryogenics Corporation provides, on a commercial basis, a client-based service for the processing and cryogenic storage of stem cells from the umbilical cords of new-born babies. The cells may be of help in the treatment of disease that might affect the donor.

=== Domestic and consumer technology ===
Domestic construction has witnessed the introduction of improved building techniques and the smart home (home automation). Both the hydraulic lift and the concrete pump/crane, are now commonly used for home construction. Furthermore, homes are built with the electronics necessary for Internet connection throughout the premises. Household systems, such as heating and cooling, lighting, communications, entertainment and even food storage and cooking are now all linked to each other through the web. In the kitchen the glass-topped stove has become popular. The living room has seen the introduction of the very large flat screen, digital plasma TV, LCD TV and LED TV technologies, which have undergone dramatic price reduction in the last few years and have replaced the cathode-ray TV in consumer appliance/electronic stores. Also popular with consumers is the iPod portable music player introduced to Canadians in 2001 and the iPhone which was made available to Canadians by Rogers Wireless in 2008. The digital camera which was introduced to Canadians in the eighties has for the most part replaced the film camera in recent years. The electronic book or E-book has gained a place in Canada beginning with the introduction of the Sony Librie reader in 2004 and the Kindle in 2009. In 2010 the iPad wireless web surfing device became available to Canadians. Other such devices have been introduced in Canada including the BlackBerry PlayBook (available in 2011). The Blu-ray Disc and associated player have been marketed in Canada since 2009. The Guitar Hero music video game released in 2007 has enjoyed great success in Canada as has the Wii video game released that same year.

Although 3D video games based on anaglyph image technology have been available in Canada since their introduction to the market in 1987, their popularity increased in 2009 partly as a result of marketing efforts by the maker of the 3D film Avatar. Popular formats include Windows (3D), PS3 (3D), PSP, Wii, Xbox 360 (3D), DS and iPhone. Users must wear special glasses with a different coloured lens over each eye in order to experience the 3D effect.

In 2008, the large Canadian banks, including the Bank of Nova Scotia, the Royal Bank of Canada, the Toronto-Dominion Bank and the Canadian Imperial Bank of Commerce, began issuing Visa credit cards with an embedded microchip for enhanced security. Also in 2008, MasterCard Canada introduced the PayPass electronic payment system to Canada. The system uses a card/tag/phone equipped with an embedded computer chip and radio frequency antennae which is tapped on a PayPass reader at participating grocery stores, convenience stores, fast food restaurants or gas stations. The card/tag/phone, wirelessly transmits information about the customer to the reader which in turn electronically charges the appropriate sum to the customer's account. A similar concept using cell phones equipped with Near Field Communications (NFC) was introduced in 2009. Known as payWave, the technique is the result of cooperation between Visa, the Royal Bank of Canada and Rogers Communications. It is intended for fast, mobile, low-cost "micro-payment" transactions of items such as fast food, coffee, and subway tokens.

Beginning in 2006, omega-3 oil became an additive in a number of foods sold in Canada.

The personal blood level alcohol tester or breathalyser was introduced to Canadians in 2010. The device, known as the BAQ Tracker, works the same way as those used by police. The user blows into a tube on the small portable hand-held machine and a digital readout of his or her blood alcohol level instantly appears on a display. Developed by Ladybug Technologies of Cambridge, Ontario, it sells for about $300.

=== Defence and security ===
In the 21st century, Canada's government has shown renewed interest in the acquisition of military technology, especially with its commitment to the war in Afghanistan. Equipment has been improved, including the CF-18 fighter with addition of laser-guided bombs and there are plans to update the Aurora patrol aircraft. The air force has also taken possession of the gigantic new C-17 Globemaster III long-range transport aircraft and has begun to renew the fleet of Hercules transport aircraft. The army has acquired the new Leopard 2 tank and C-777 long-range gun, and in 2009 announced the acquisition of the Close Combat Vehicle. In 2003, the Forces took possession of their first tactical unmanned aerial vehicle (TUAV), the French-designed CU-161 Sperwer, and the Heron UAV in February 2009. Used for the war in Afghanistan, these machines provide an intelligence, surveillance and reconnaissance (ISR) capability for the Forces. In 2008, the Air Force announced that it would acquire its first attack helicopters (Griffons equipped with light machine guns) for service there as well. In 2006, the Navy undertook the Halifax Class Modernization/Frigate Equipment Life Extension Project (HCM/FELIX) to modernize its 12 Halifax Class Frigates. New equipment will include improved computer fire control systems, sensors and the decoy-based Rheinmettal Multi Ammunition Softkill System, a passive missile defence system. Acquisitions pending include the CH-148 Cyclone ASW helicopter, the Chinook helicopter, new Arctic patrol vessels for the navy and a new ice breaker for the Canadian Coast Guard. In July 2010, the Government of Canada announced the C$9 billion purchase of 65 F-35A fighters for delivery beginning in 2016.

In 2009, the Canadian government announced a C$880 million upgrade, including new facilities, of the signal intelligence capability of the Communications Security Establishment Canada in Ottawa, to be completed by 2015. The importance of electronic warfare on the battlefield, as demonstrated in the War in Afghanistan, was highlighted in April 2010 by the formation of 21 Electronic Warfare Regiment at CFB Kingston. The unit, the first new regiment to be formed in the Canadian Army since WWII, is being equipped with the most modern electronic warfare technology and will practice both defensive and offensive electronic warfare.

The Polar Epsilon project, approved in 2005 and slated to be fully operational by 2011, uses Radarsat 2 to provide military commanders with imagery of Canada's Arctic. Another surveillance project, Polar Breeze (until recently classified secret), will use shore-based sea surface search radar, satellite-based (Radarsat 2) imagery and underwater listening devices to monitor sea surface and underwater traffic in the choke points of the Northwest Passage. The Canadian Forces have also acquired updated electronic equipment to conduct more advanced electronic warfare to face the new cybernetic threat and conduct cybernetic warfare (cyber-warfare).

The Taser (also known as the conducted energy weapon) has been adopted for use by Canadian police forces, including the RCMP, in recent years. The technology presently deployed was developed in the US in 1999. Intended for use as a "non-lethal" weapon, the Taser fires darts trailing wires connected to a battery in the hand-held pistol. The darts strike and lodge themselves in the suspect. The battery delivers, through the wires, a jolt of electricity that incapacitates the suspect. Its use in Canada has led to considerable controversy following the deaths of four individuals who were tasered by police in separate incidents in 2007.

== End note ==
In the earlier parts of Canada's history, the state often played a crucial role in the diffusion of these technologies, in some cases through a monopoly enterprise, in others with a private "partner". In more recent times, the need for the role of the state has diminished in the presence of a larger private sector.

In the latter part of the 20th century, there is evidence that Canadian values prefer public expenditures on social programmes at the expense of public spending on the maintenance and expansion of public technical infrastructure. This can be seen in the fact that in 2008 the Federation of Canadian Municipalities estimated that it would take $123 billion to restore and repair aging urban infrastructure across Canada.

== See also ==
- Technological and industrial history of 20th-century Canada
- Science and technology in Canada
- Artificial intelligence industry in Canada
- Canadian government scientific research organizations
- Canadian industrial research and development organizations
- Canadian inventions
- Canadian Mining Hall of Fame
- Canadian scientists
- Canadian space program
- Canadian university scientific research organizations
- CP Ships
- Energy policy of Canada
- Former tallest buildings in Canada by province and territory
- History of the petroleum industry in Canada
- Internet in Canada
- List of aircraft of the Canadian Air Force
- List of airlines of Canada
- List of airports in Canada
- List of bridges in Canada
- List of Canadian Navy ships
- List of infantry weapons and equipment of the Canadian military
- List of reservoirs and dams in Canada
- Nuclear power in Canada
- Television in Canada
  - Digital television in Canada
  - Timeline of the Canadian Broadcasting Corporation
- Scientific research in Canada
- Economic history of Canada
