= Ogivar =

Defunct Canadian computer company

Ogivar Technologies Inc.
- Company type: Public
- Industry: Computer
- Founded: 1982; 44 years ago in Montreal, Quebec
- Founders: Jaime Benchimol; Patrick Gauthier; Erick Antoine
- Defunct: 1992; 34 years ago
- Fate: Bankruptcy dissolution
- Number of employees: 95 (1991)

Ogivar Technologies Inc. was a Canadian computer company founded in Montreal, Quebec, in 1982 and 1992. Active for roughly a decade, the company primarily manufactured IBM PC compatibles before having the majority of its assets bought out by Tandem International, an electrochemical company, following bankruptcy proceedings. It was once one of Canada's top manufacturers of personal computers.

== History ==
Ogivar Technologies was founded in late 1982 by five business partners with $25,000 in equity and a credit line provided by a Montreal branch of the Royal Bank of Canada. One of the founders, Jaime Benchimol, was 23 when the company started; by 1985 he was the company's president. Patrick Gauthier, 29 when the company started, had the role of financial officer by 1985, and Erick Antoine, at 39, was by that year the head of engineering for the company's printed-circuit board manufacturing operations. By January 1985, the company had fourteen employees. The company filed its initial public offering in 1986, reaching a share price of $3.25 on opening day, eventually reaching $7 per share later in the year.

The company's first product was a clone of the IBM PC XT, called the Panama XT. It was manufactured in Ogivar's 2,500-square-foot facility in Saint-Laurent, located along the Trans-Canada Highway. Between December 1983 and January 1985, the company sold 500 units, generating $1.2 million in sales. It received accolades in a report prepared by the Government of Quebec, who rated it above the IBM XT on which the computer was based. By the end of fiscal year 1985, the company posted $7.7 million in sales, and by fiscal year 1986's end, that figure had grown to $22 million. Ogivar by that point employed 78 people and had introduced a clone of the IBM PC/AT, called the Panama 286 X, a revised version of the Panama XT called the Panama Professional, and the i386-based Panama 386. With the latter, Ogivar was one of the first two computer manufacturers in Canada to release a 32-bit PC clone.

In April 1988, Ogivar opened up a subsidiary in the United States to market its products there. Following an embargo on Toshiba-produced laptops for purchase within the federal government of the United States effective between 1988 and 1991, Ogivar announced their intent to "fill the void" created by the ban by selling its own laptops to American federal institutions. Ogivar also hoped to capture 10 percent of Toshiba's annual unit sales of 150,000 laptops that they achieved in 1987. In 1988 they released the Ogivar 286, a clone of the Toshiba T3100. In July 1989 the Company's CEO Jaime Benchimol resigned to pursue other interests and was replaced By Gary Sharp who continued the company mission until 1992. Jaime Benchimol remain on the board of directors until the company was sold.

In March 1990, the company added offices in Vancouver, British Columbia, in an attempt to spread brand recognition among western Canadians.

Ogivar was hit hard in 1991, losing $4.4 million in the first nine months and having its stock price plummet. by July 1991. Plans to open a manufacturing plant in Moscow—started in February 1990 amid talks with the Soviet Union after they expressed interest in making a bulk purchase of Ogivar's PCs—fizzled in the summer of 1991. In October 1991, the company laid off 30% of its employees. Earlier, in 1990, a complaint was issued by the Quebec Securities Commission concerning the filing of an annual statement in 1987, 3 years earlier. The claim filed under the penal code, alleged that the 1987 financial statements were misleading due to a consignment sale that should not have been included in the annual report. In early February 1992, the company filed for bankruptcy protection in Quebec. Later in the month, Ogivar found a buyer in Tandem International, a Quebec electrochemical company, who purchased most of the company's assets, including the brand name. Tandem planned to revive the Ogivar brand in 1992. Following an eight-month court wait, the Quebec Securities Commission dropped most of the allegations against Ogivar but found them only guilty of an erroneous sale reported in the 1987 fiscal period, for which they were fined CA$10,000 in 1992.

Subsequently the acquirer Tandem separated the assets into two divisions. The government defense contract division was sold to SHL SYSTEMHOUSE, a large computer services organization from Ottawa. SHL SYSTEMHOUSE retained the CAL PMO contract and the original founder Jaime Benchimol was brought back to operate the newly formed software division SYSTEMCORP.

SYTEMCORP operated successfully for 13 years acquiring a large base of fortune 500 clients across US and Canada. In 2004 SYSTEMCORP was sold to IBM. As part of the acquisition conditions, the company staff including the president, Jaime Benchimol joined the IBM Rational team.
