= Natural scientific research in Canada =

This article outlines the history of natural scientific research in Canada, including physics, astronomy, space science, geology, oceanography, chemistry, biology, and medical research. Neither the social sciences nor the formal sciences are treated here.

== Beginnings of science (AD 1600 – AD 1850) ==
=== European explorers, universities, and talented amateurs (1600–1850) ===
==== Marine science ====
The early European explorers were responsible for charting much of what would become the east and west coasts of Canada as well as the Arctic. John Cabot, the Italian explorer sailing under the English flag made two voyages to North America in 1497 and 1498 along the coast of what is now called Newfoundland. Gaspar Corte-Real, the Portuguese explorer, is thought to have explored the area along the Newfoundland, Labrador and Greenland coasts in 1500 and 1501. In 1524, Giovanni da Verrazzano sailing under the French flag, explored the east coast of North America from Cape Fear to Newfoundland. During voyages of exploration in 1534 and 1535–1536, the French explorer Jacques Cartier "discovered" and mapped the St. Lawrence River as far inland as Hochelaga (Montreal). Samuel de Champlain is well known for his explorations of the St Lawrence and Acadia, in 1603 and 1604.

The search for fabled Northwest Passage to the orient intrigued European explorers for 300 years. The first efforts in this regard were made by British explorers Martin Frobisher in 1576 and by John Davis in 1585. In 1610 Henry Hudson made his ill-fated voyage in search of the Passage. William Baffin and Robert Bylot sailed the Arctic sea in the area around what became known as Baffin Island in 1616. While these voyages not successful, in that they did not discover the Northwest Passage, they provided valuable information on the nature of the Arctic Ocean.

Voyages by William Edward Parry in 1819 and John Ross in 1829 added to the growing body of knowledge relating to the north. The Hudson's Bay Company also played a role in Arctic exploration and during the period 1837–1839, Peter Warren Dease and Thomas Simpson of that company explored the Arctic coast from Point Barrow to Rae Strait. In 1845, Sir John Franklin with two ships, HMS Erebus and HMS Terror, set sail to find the Passage. He died in the attempt.

In 1774, Captain Juan Perez Hernandez, aboard the Spanish ship Santiago, became the first white man to explore the west coast and is reported to have sailed as far north as the Dixon Entrance. The following year Spanish hydrographer, Bodega y Quadra, drew the first charts to show a part of the west coast of Canada. The renowned Captain James Cook explored the west coast in 1778 as part of an attempt to find the Northwest Passage from the Pacific, rather than the Atlantic side. In 1791–1792 Captain George Vancouver of Britain and Dionisio Alcalá-Galiano and Cayetano Valdés of Spain conducted further surveys in the area.

==== Universities and talented amateurs ====
Military surgeon and naturalist Michel Sarrazin (1659–1734), who lived in Quebec for more than four decades, was one of the earliest documenters of the flora and fauna of New France. The Jesuits, learned men who arrived with the colonists, also had an interest in science. In particular they founded in 1635 in Quebec City the College de Québec, eventually known as Université Laval, which would become one of the Group of 13 large research universities in Canada. Other future G-13 members founded during this period, included, Dalhousie University in Halifax, Nova Scotia in 1818, McGill University in Montreal in 1821, the University of Toronto in 1827, Queen's University in Kingston, Ontario, in 1841 and the University of Ottawa in 1848. Colonial scientific curricula between 1750 and 1850, included rudimentary studies in astronomy, mathematics, medicine, chemistry, natural philosophy, natural history and moral philosophy. As the colony grew by the beginning of the 19th century, a number of amateur "scientists", notably in Montreal and Toronto, began to record and study nature as a gentlemanly pursuit and established local learned societies.

==== Astronomy ====
Astronomy was one of the first scientific disciplines practiced in the northern North America. There are records of astronomical observations made by Arctic explorers dating from 1612 and by French missionaries in New France who noted eclipses as early as 1618 and 1632. The Marquis de Chabert is reported to have built one of the first observatories in North America at Fort Louisbourg in 1750. A small observatory was built by Joseph DesBarres at Castle Frederick, Nova Scotia, in 1765.

==== Chemistry ====
Elementary courses in chemistry were introduced into the curriculum of the Seminaires de Québec by Abbot John Holmes in 1830 and Abbot Isaac Desaulniers in Saint-Hyacinthe as well as the Seminaire de Montréal in 1842.

==== Biology ====
Interest in biology in Canada dates from the times of European exploration. Botany attracted explorers and scientists such as Cartier 1503, Clusius 1576, C. Bauhin 1623, J. Cornuti 1635, P. Boucher 1664, M. Sarrazin 1697, J.F. Gauthier 1742, A. Michaud, 1785, W.J. Hooker 1820, A.F. Holmes 1821, L. Provencher 1862 and J. Macoun 1883, who collected and/or named various plants found in Canada. Zoology as well was the subject of much early activity. Reports and studies by J. Cabot 1497, N. Denys 1672, C. Perrault and M. Sarrazin 1660, T. Pennent 1784, J. Richardson 1819, P.H. Gosse 1840 and M. Perley 1849, related to the nature of animals found throughout Canada's eastern and northern regions. A reflection of this activity is seen in the founding of the Botanical Society of Canada in Kingston, Ontario in 1860 and the Entomological Society of Canada in 1863.

== Rise of professional science (1850–1900) ==
Scientific research in Canada as a formal undertaking dates from the 1850s and was the result of the impetus provided by the establishment of government scientific research organizations, new universities and the evolution of academic disciplines. It was also placed on a professional footing through the institutionalization of the twin concepts of the "scientific method' and "peer review" as seen in the establishment of the Royal Society of Canada in 1883.

=== Government research organizations ===
Government organizations specializing in science established during this period included the Geological Survey of Canada (1841), the Dominion Experimental Farms (1886) and the Biological Board (fisheries research).

=== New universities and changing curricula ===
Additional future members of the G-13 were founded, including Université de Montréal and the University of Western Ontario in London, Ontario in 1878 and McMaster University in Hamilton, Ontario in 1887. University science curricula also changed during this period. Natural philosophy evolved into physics and became closely allied with mathematics. Natural history evolved into geology, biology, zoology and botany.

Canada's first, "national" scientific/learned/professional association, the Canadian Medical Association was created during this period, in Quebec City in October 1867. In 1882 the founding of the Royal Society of Canada reflected the maturation of Canada's intellectual development by becoming the first "national" organization to recognize and promote among other things achievement in science.

=== Royal Society of Canada and peer review ===
The hallmark on modern science is the emphasis on the concept of peer review, whereby the research of scientists is open to the scrutiny of their peers. This concept is recognized to have originated with the Royal Society of London established in 1645. In 1883, inspired in part by this organization and the Institut de France, the Royal Society of Canada was established by the Governor General, the Marquis of Lorne. Founding members included Sir Sanford Fleming and Sir William Osler. Peer reviewed articles appeared in the Society publication "Proceedings" first produced in 1882.

=== Disciplines (1850–1900) ===
==== Geology ====
Professional science in Canada began with the founding of the Geological Survey of Canada, by the Legislature of the Province of Canada, in 1841. William Logan was appointed the first director in 1842 and after establishing headquarters in Montreal in 1843 began field work searching for coal in the area between Pictou, Nova Scotia, and the Gaspé Peninsula in Canada. His assistant Alexander Perry conducted a similar search in the area between Lakes Huron and Erie. Although no coal was found the surveys demonstrated the importance of systematic study of Canada's land mass. The survey grew during the forties and in 1851 participated in the Crystal Palace Exhibition in London, England, as well as the Universal Exposition in Paris, in 1855. The efforts of the survey were so successful that in 1863 it was able to publish its first major work, The Geology of Canada. With Confederation the survey's area of geographic responsibility grew dramatically as did its reputation, being recognized by the government as an important agent in the establishment of a mining industry in Canada. This recognition also resulted in the headquarters being moved to Ottawa in 1881. As Canada grew the survey studied the routes of the new Canadian Pacific Railway as well as other areas of the west and north. Director Dawson surveyed British Columbia and the Yukon; Robert Bell studied the north and the coastal areas of Hudson Bay and Hudson Strait. Geologist Tyrell found coal and fossils in Alberta and J. Mackintosh Bell studied the area from Lake Athabasca to Great Bear Lake in 1900. Sailing aboard the Neptune geologist Low explored the Arctic archipelago in 1903–04.

==== Physics ====
The first full professorships in physics were established at Dalhousie in Halifax in 1879, Toronto in 1887 and McGill in Montreal in 1890. Although these were mainly teaching positions, there was some research activity. At Dalhousie, Professor J. G. McGregor, the first to hold the position at that university, published about 50 papers during his tenure from 1879 until 1899. Other prominent researchers in the field at this time included H. L. Callendar and E. Rutherford, Macdonald professors of physics at McGill and J. C. McLennan at U of T.

==== Astronomy ====
The discipline experienced modest growth during this period. New but small observatories were built including: the Toronto Magnetic and Meteorological Observatory, in 1840, a facility at the Citadel in Quebec City in 1850, one at the University of New Brunswick in Fredericton in 1851, in Kingston, Ontario in 1856, in Montreal in 1862 and another in Quebec City on the Plains of Abraham in 1874.

==== Chemistry ====
The study of chemistry in Canada began in a modest way in 1829, with courses on the subject at the Montreal General Hospital given as part of medical training. At King's College (University of New Brunswick) in Fredericton, as early as 1837, James Robb taught a course in natural science that included the study of chemistry within the context of botany, zoology, mineralogy and geology. Isaac Chipman of Acadia University in Wolfville, Nova Scotia introduced chemistry at that institution in 1840 as did Henry How at King's College in Windsor, Nova Scotia. Henry Holmes Croft was appointed professor of chemistry and experimental philosophy at King's College (University of Toronto) in Toronto in 1842, where he specialized in toxicology and inorganic chemistry. In 1843, William Sutherland of the Montreal Medical and Surgical School began teaching chemistry in its own right at McGill University and the University of Montreal. Growth during the decades that followed was steady but modest. However, by the 1890s, buildings with well-equipped laboratories devoted to the study of chemistry had been built, including Carruthers Hall, 1891 at Queen's, in Kingston, the Chemistry Building, 1895 at the University of Toronto, and the Macdonald Chemistry and Mining Building at McGill in Montreal in 1898.

The Geological Survey of Canada also developed expertise in the field, hiring Thomas Sterry Hunt in 1847 as a chemist and mineralogist. He was succeeded in this role by G.C. Hoffmann a charter member of the Royal Society of Canada.

==== Biology ====
Professional biology in Canada dates from the creation of departments of natural history, which included the study of biology, at the Universities of Toronto and McGill in 1854 and 1858 respectively. Government interest in biology was reflected in the establishment of the Experimental Farm Service in 1886 with Professor William Saunders as the first Director. A Central Experimental Farm was established in Ottawa that year as well as regional farms in Nappan, Nova Scotia in 1887, and Brandon, Manitoba, Indian Head, Northwest Territories and Agassiz, BC in 1888. A number of divisions for the study of topics of special interest to Canadian farmers were established including, entomology and botany, horticulture, chemistry, poultry, cereal, agriculture and tobacco.

Public interest in biology led to the creation of the Botanical Garden at Queen's College in Kingston, Ontario in 1861, the Riverdale Zoo in Toronto, in 1887, the Dominion Arboretum in Ottawa that same year and the Stanley Park Zoo in Vancouver in 1888.

==== Medical research ====
Medical research in 19th century Canada was modest. The first medical schools were founded during the early part of the 19th century. The Medical Faculty of the University of Montreal was established in 1824 as was that of the University of Toronto. The Faculté de médicine de l'Université de Montréal offered the first French-language course in medicine in Canada beginning in 1843. The medical faculties at Queen's in Kingston, Canada West, and Dalhousie in Halifax, Nova Scotia, were established in 1854 and 1867 respectively, followed by those at the University of Western Ontario in 1881 and the University of Manitoba in 1888. While they were excellent institutions of instruction, there was no systematic emphasis on medical investigation. Research began almost "accidentally" with the curiosity of William Beaumont in Quebec, who was able to investigate gastric digestion in 1825 through the fistula created by injury in the abdomen of Alexis St. Martin, a voyager.

=== Scientists of note (1850–1900) ===
Scientists of this period included: William Edmond Logan, 1798–1875 (geology), John William Dawson, 1820–1899 (paleobotany), Sandford Fleming, 1827–1915 (engineer/inventor), Sir William Osler, 1849–1919 (medicine), C.H. McLeod (astronomy), W.F. King (astronomy), Otto Julius Klotz, 1852–1923 (astronomy) and E.G.D. Deville (astronomy).

=== Research laboratories, Nobel Prizes and the NRC (1900–1939) ===
==== University laboratories ====
At the beginning of the twentieth the "research laboratory" was introduced to Canadian universities. The physics laboratory established at McGill in Montreal was home to the discovery of the atomic nucleus by Ernest Rutherford, an achievement for which he received the Nobel Prize in 1908. The University of Toronto established the Connaught Laboratories where Sir Frederick Banting and Best discovered insulin, and won a Nobel Prize as well in 1923. The Dunlap Observatory at the same university was built in 1935. In 1938, l'Institut de microbiologie et d'hygiène de Montréal (l'Institut Armand-Frappier) was founded.

The new century witnessed the founding of other future G-13 schools, the University of Alberta in Edmonton and the University of British Columbia in Vancouver, British Columbia, both in 1908 as well as the Canadian Society for Chemistry in 1917. The Association of Universities and Colleges of Canada was established in 1911 for the purposes of promoting scientific research among other things. In 1931 the need to recognize and support scientific study and research in the French language led to the founding of L'association canadienne francaise pour l'avancement des sciences (Acfas).

In the early 20th century moral philosophy evolved into what is today recognized as "social science", economics, sociology, political science etc. This new field of scientific research contributed significantly to the efforts of the Rowell-Sirois Commission studying the effects of the depression on Canada's political economy.

The thirties also saw the creation in 1935 of the Fields Medal, the "Nobel Prize" of mathematics, named in honour of its champion, John Charles Fields, a prominent mathematician at the University of Toronto.

==== Disciplines (1900–1939) ====
===== Physics =====
The growth of physics was notable during this period.

The landmark event, one of the greatest discoveries in the history of physics and the greatest event in the history of Canadian physics, was the discovery of the atomic nucleus by Ernest Rutherford, Chairman of the Department of Physics at McGill University from 1898 until 1907.

Another development of monumental importance involved experiments by the Italian inventor Guglielmo Marconi, in the field of electromagnetic radiation and his "transmission" of radio signals across the Atlantic from a transmitter in Cornwall, England to a receiver in St. John's, Newfoundland on 12 December 1901.

J. C. McLennan, director of the physics laboratory at U of T from 1906 to 1932, undertook studies in atmospheric conductivity and cathode rays, but in 1912 was inspired by the work of Bohr, to conduct research into atomic spectroscopy. He, along with G. M. Shrum, constructed the first machine for the liquification of helium in North America, which was used for cryogenic studies of metals and solid gases. Research into colloid physics in the twenties and thirties by E. F. Burton and his students led to the construction of the first electron microscope in North America. Geophysics research was also undertaken at the U of T at this time by L. Gilchrist. At McGill, L.V. King studied mathematical physics while D.A. Keys and A.S. Eve conducted research into geophysics and J.S Marshall into atmospheric physics. McGill also established the first theoretical physics group at a Canadian university. At the University of Alberta, R.W. Boyle became the first professor of physics in 1912 and conducted research into ultrasound while F. Allen established the physics department at the University of Manitoba and bent his efforts towards the physics of physiology. At the University of Saskatchewan, E. L. Harrington was the first physics department head from 1924 to 1956, during which time that institution developed expertise in upper atmospheric research, begun by B.W. Currie in 1932. From 1935 to 1945, Gerhard Herzberg studied atomic and molecular physics there. Physics began at Queen's with the work of A. L. Clark and nuclear research was conducted there by J. A. Gray, B. W. Sargent, A. T. Stewart and others. H. L. Bronson, department head at Dalhousie, was active in physics research from 1910 to 1956.

===== Astronomy =====
The first significant Canadian astronomical facility, the Dominion Observatory, was built in Ottawa in 1905 by the federal government. It featured a refracting telescope and a reflecting solar telescope. This was followed in 1918 by the new Dominion Astrophysical Observatory near Victoria, British Columbia. The 1.88 m (72 inch) reflecting telescope there had been proposed and designed by John Plaskett in 1910 with the backing of the International Union for Cooperation in Solar Research and when it began operation was briefly the largest telescope in the world. The University of Toronto established the first astronomy department in a Canadian university in 1904 and through the efforts of department head Chant and the generosity of a private citizen, a large facility, the David Dunlap Observatory was built there in 1935.

===== Geology =====
The early 20th century was a difficult time for geology in Canada. The Geological Survey experienced funding and staffing difficulties as the pressures of the Great War placed the focus of government elsewhere. However field studies continued to emphasize the importance of mineral wealth and the survey's activities proved fruitful in spite of strained resources. In the lean Depression Years annual budgets hovered in the low hundreds of thousands of dollars. In 1935 in an effort to stimulate the economy and create employment the budget of the Survey was dramatically increased to $1 million and field work increased tenfold. During these years the Survey made use of aircraft in its activities for the first time.

One of the great geological finds of all time was made during this period. In 1909, Charles Doolittle Walcott, discovered what came to be known as the Burgess Shale, near Field, British Columbia, a rock formation that contained the well preserved fossil remains of animals from the Cambrian geological era.

====== Oceanography ======
The establishment of two professional scientific organizations, the Hydrographic Survey of Canada and the Biological Board, the precursor of the Fisheries Research Board, at the turn of the 20th century, marked the beginning of modern Canadian oceanography. As the result of a tragic marine accident on Georgian Bay the Government of Canada created the Georgian Bay Survey in 1883 to produce reliable navigation charts for safe navigation on that Bay and Lake Huron. The Survey began the hydrographic charting of the west coast in 1891, tidal and current metering in 1893 and the charting of the St. Lawrence River below Quebec City, in 1905. In 1904 under an Order-in-Council it became the Hydrographic Survey of Canada with an expanded mandate.

In 1908, the federal government established permanent biological research field stations at St. Andrews, New Brunswick (St. Andrews Biological Station) and Nanaimo, British Columbia, for the scientific study of the fisheries on the east and west coasts. These operations were managed by the Biological Board created in 1912 and renamed the Fisheries Research Council in 1937. Originally staffed by university summer student volunteers, professional full-time scientific staff were hired and laboratories related to the fisheries and food processing established on both coasts, in the twenties. Joseph-Elzéar Bernier aboard the Arctic undertook voyages to the Arctic in 1904, 1907 and 1909. During the latter he unveiled a plaque on Melville Island and claimed the Arctic Islands as part of Canada.

===== Chemistry =====
The growth of the discipline continued in the new century. Departments were established in a number of universities including, chemistry and physical chemistry, at Toronto, 1900, the University of Alberta, Edmonton, 1909, Saskatchewan, 1910, a unified chemistry department at McGill, 1912, the University of British Columbia, Vancouver, 1915, Université de Montréal, 1920, McMaster, Hamilton, 1930, Sir George Williams College, Montreal, 1936, neurochemistry, the University of Western Ontario, London, Ontario, 1947 and at Bishop's University, 1948.

Graduate programmes in chemistry emphasizing original research were also introduced including: an M.Sc., McGill, 1900, Ph.D., Toronto, 1901, M.Sc., McMaster, 1909, Ph.D., McGill, 1910, M.Sc., University of Alberta, Edmonton, 1915, M.Sc., University of Saskatchewan, 1923, M.Sc., University of New Brunswick, Fredericton, 1948 and an M.Sc., at the University of Manitoba, Winnipeg, 1949.

Noted university chemists of the period with their date of departmental appointment, included, A.L.F. Lehmann, University of Alberta, 1909, R.D. MacLaurin, University of Saskatchewan, 1910, R.F. Ruttan, McGill, 1912, Lash Miller, Toronto, 1914, D. McIntosh, University of British Columbia, Vancouver, 1915, T. Thorvaldson, University of Saskatchewan, 1919, G. Baril, Université de Montréal, 1920 and C. E. Burke, McMaster, Hamilton, 1930. The discipline evolved during these years with specializations in physical chemistry and biochemistry.

The National Research Council became involved in chemistry during these years. In 1929 the Council founded the Department of Industrial Chemistry with G.S. Whitby as the Director. The Department studied the industrial production and uses of magnesium, natural gas, asbestos, wool, maple products and rubber among other things using new laboratories built on Sussex Street in Ottawa in 1932. In 1939, E.W.R. Steacie became the Director of the Division of Chemistry and led that organization through the difficult war years. He championed the independence of the Council and the importance of pure scientific research.

===== Biology =====
Biochemistry, the chemical basis for biology, developed significantly during these years. Departments were established at Toronto, 1907, The Western University of London, 1921, McGill, 1922, University of Manitoba, Winnipeg, 1923, Dalhousie University, Halifax, 1923, Université de Montréal, 1925, Université Laval, Quebec City, 1928, Queen's, Kingston, 1937, University of Saskatchewan, 1946 and the University of Ottawa, 1946. The research in these departments was closely related to that of their associated biology departments.

The Experimental Farm Service grew dramatically in the early part of the new century. A large number of farms were created across the country at locations including, Summerland 1914, Vancouver 1925, Kamloops 1935, Creston 1940 and Prince George 1940, all in British Columbia, Lethbridge 1906, Lacombe 1907 and Fort Vermilion 1907, in Alberta, Rosthern 1909, Saskatoon 1917, Swift Current 1921, Regina 1931 and Melfort 1935, in Saskatchewan, Morden 1918, Winnipeg 1924 and Portage la Prairie 1944 in Manitoba, Harrow 1913, Kapuskasing 1916, Delhi 1933 and Thunder Bay 1937 in Ontario, La Pocatière 1912, Lennoxville 1914 and L'Assomption 1928, in Quebec, Fredericton 1912, New Brunswick 1912, Charlottetown 1909, PEI and Kentville, Nova Scotia 1911. The Service also established an Entomological Branch in 1914 to study the control of field crop insects, forest insects, foreign pests and stored product insects. A Science Service was created in 1937 which included divisions for bacteriology, biology and plant pathology, animal pathology, chemistry, entomology and forest biology. Of particular note was the development of Marquis wheat by researcher Charles E. Saunders during this period.

The turn of the 20th century saw the initiation of forest research in Canada with the creation of the Canadian Forest Service (CFS) in 189 and the appointment of Elihu Stewart as the first federal Chief Inspector of Timber. In the early years the Service focused on soil conservation, snow management and crop stabilization and to this end, from 1901 to 1920 distributed over 50,000,000 seedlings to prairie farmers. In the thirties, J.G. Wright conducted the first studies into controlled forest burns as a technique of forest management, an activity which generated considerable controversy at the time. W.E.D. Halliday of the Service studied forest classification and in 1937 published his landmark study, A Forest Classification for Canada. The Service conducted intensive research into pest management with noteworthy results by R.E. Balch relating to the European spruce sawfly and Douglas Embree on the control of the winter moth in Canada's eastern forests.

In 1928, the National Research Council created the Division of Biology and Agriculture. Initially working at the University of Alberta the Division moved into the new laboratory in Ottawa in 1932 and studied the biochemistry of wheat rust, gluten proteins and mutation in cereals among other things.

===== Medical research =====
Medical investigation grew dramatically in the new century. Almost immediately after Roentgen's discovery of the x-ray, was used for clinical examination in Montreal on 8 February in 1896. There were as well, investigations into sepsis at the Montreal General Hospital in 1907. J.B. Collip isolated the hormone of the parathyroid gland in 1926 and Maud Abbott of McGill studied congenital diseases of the heart. Lucas and Henderson of Toronto discovered the anesthetic properties of cyclopropane in 1929 and Norman Bethune of Montreal developed the first blood bank and battlefield transfusion techniques.

Three institutional pillars of medical research were established during these years. The Connaught Laboratories in Toronto, in 1917, the Montreal Neurological Institute in 1934 and the Institute de microbiologie de Montréal.

In 1914 John Fitzgerald established laboratories in Toronto to produce vaccines for smallpox, rabies, diphtheria and tetanus. The facility was named the Connaught laboratories in 1917 in honour of Prince Albert, the Duke of Connaught, the recently retired Governor General. Beginning in 1922 the laboratories began to mass-produce the newly discovered hormone insulin.

The discovery of insulin by Sir Frederick Banting, C. H. Best, J.J.R. MacLeod and J.B. Collip in 1921–22 in a laboratory funded from the Carnegie Corporation at the University of Toronto stands as a landmark in Canadian medical research.

With a grant of $1,000,000 from the US Rockefeller Foundation, McGill University established the Montreal Neurological Institute in 1934. In these facilities Wilder Penfield undertook research into the surgical treatment of epilepsy and scientific inquiry into the nature of the temporal lobe of the human brain.

In 1938, Armand Frappier obtained $75,000 from the government of Quebec after years of effort for the establishment of L'institute de microbiologie de Montréal an organization devoted to the teaching of microbiology, research into the field and the industrial production of vaccines. In 1941, after moving into facilities at the newly constructed Université de Montréal, the Institute began producing vaccines for diphtheria, tetanus and typhoid as well as blood plasma for the war effort.

The Hospital for Sick Children, founded in Toronto in 1875, established the Nutritional Research Laboratory in 1918. Here, in 1930, the researchers Alan Brown, Fred Tisdall, and Theo Drake invented what became known as Pablum, a pre-cooked baby cereal that has saved the lives of thousands of children. In 1934, Tisdall and Drake demonstrated the benefits of enriching milk with vitamin D. The hospital also constructed more than 30 iron lungs for children in Ontario who were the victims of the polio epidemic of 1937.

The Canadian Cancer Society, founded in 1938 to educate Canadians about the early warning signs of cancer, has become a major contributor to the funding of cancer research in Canada.

In 1936, the NRC significantly created the Associate Committee of Medical Research to fund medical research in Canada. This organization became the Division of Medical Research in 1956 and the Medical Research Council in 1960.

==== Scientists of note (1900–1939) ====
Scientists who made their mark during this period included: Charles Augustus Chant, 1865–1956 (astronomy), John Stanley Plaskett, 1865–1941 (astronomy), Charles E. Saunders, 1867–1937 (botany), Harriet Brooks, 1867–1933 (atomic physics), Maude Abbott, 1869–1940 (medicine), Stephen Leacock, 1869–1944 (economics), Frances Gertrude McGill, 1882–1959 (forensic pathology), Oswald Avery, 1877–1955 (biology), Alice Wilson, 1881–1964 (geology), Frere Marie-Victorin, 1885–1944 (biology), Margret Newton, 1887–1971 (biology), Wilder Penfield, 1891–1976 (neurology) and Harold Innis, 1894–1952 (economics).

== Science at war (1939–1945) ==
=== Funding and pure science ===
The fortunes of scientific research during World War II were mixed.

The social sciences did not do well. The Social Science Federation of Canada (1940) and the closely related Canadian Social Science Research Council and well as the Canadian Federation for the Humanities (1943) and the associated Humanities Research Council of Canada, were all created to counter wartime conditions that threatened the funding of the social sciences and humanities in Canadian universities. Ironically, both research councils relied on funding from US philanthropic organizations, including the Rockefeller Foundation and the Carnegie Corporation, to administer their programs, until the establishment of the Canada Council in 1957.

Of note is the fact that the demands for war research personnel by the National Research Council during these years threatened to deplete the science staff at Canadian universities.

However it is also important to note that the scale and achievement of wartime atomic research inspired the founding of both the Canadian Association of Physicists and the Canadian Mathematical Society in 1945.

Finally, World War II mobilization, created an acute public familiarity with the breathtaking power of science (the atomic bomb), large organizational structures, complex management techniques and state sponsored funding programmes that would characterize post-war university as well as industrial research. With the end of the war these factors resulted in the release of a pent-up demand.

In 1943 the Royal Society of Canada created the Henry Marshall Tory Medal. It is awarded every two years to an outstanding Canadian researcher in the natural sciences.

=== Disciplines (1939–1945) ===
==== Physics ====
The use of theoretical and applied physics were an extremely important part of Canada's war effort as reflected in activities involving the development of atomic energy. The Tizard Mission, a delegation of British scientists and military experts, visiting North America to promote wartime allied scientific cooperation, met with NRC nuclear physicist George Laurence in Ottawa in 1940. As a result of this meeting, beginning in 1942, a Montreal-based British-Canadian project under the aegis of the National Research Council undertook the construction of a heavy-water atomic reactor. An experimental device with graphite control rods, ZEEP (Zero Energy Experimental Pile), was built at Chalk River Ontario before the end of the war, and on 5 September 1945 achieved "the first self-sustained nuclear reaction outside the United States". This momentous event was followed by the construction of a larger, full-sized reactor the NRX in 1947, also at Chalk River. Studies in radar and optics were also of importance and the practical results of these efforts were seen in the radar sets and range finders, manufactured by Research Enterprises Limited, a crown corporation.

Applied physics research was at the centre of activity at Turbo Research (Orenda) a top secret jet engine development enterprise. This crown corporation was established in 1944 at Leaside, near Toronto and developed power plants including the TR.1, TR.2, TR.3, and TR.5, for RCAF aircraft.

== Explosive growth (1945–1985) ==
=== Universities and government research agencies (1945–1985) ===
Universities, the home of academic research, experienced explosive growth as students, the baby boomers and public funds swelled newly created campus science faculties and research institutes. An example of this growth can be seen in the proliferation of learned societies in the field of biology. Their numbers were sufficient to lead to the creation of an umbrella group, The Canadian Federation of Biological Societies in 1957. Similarly the Canadian Geoscience Council, a federation of seven Canadian geoscience societies was founded in 1972, including among its members the Geological Association of Canada formed in 1947. Of special note was the growth of the social sciences in the sixties.

Future G-13 institutions founded during this period included the University of Waterloo, in Waterloo, Ontario in 1957 and the University of Calgary in Calgary, Alberta in 1966.

At the same time a number of federal governmental research organizations were spun off from the National Research Council. These included the Communications Security Establishment (1946), Defense Research Board (1947), Atomic Energy of Canada Limited (1952) and the Medical Research Council of Canada (1966). Provincial governments continued to establish research organizations as well with the BC Research Council being founded in 1944, the Nova Scotia Research Foundation in 1946 and the Saskatchewan Research Council in 1947. The Government of Quebec established L'Institut national de la recherche scientifique in 1967.

A private virtual organization, the Canadian Institute for Advanced Research was founded in 1982 and studies topics related to cosmology, nanotechnology and biodiversity among others.

=== Funding agencies (1945–1985) ===
In the pre-war era, the NRC had provided meager resources for the funding of university research in natural science, engineering and medicine. The post war-era changed this. Medical research funding became the responsibility of the Medical Research Council founded in 1960. Natural science and engineering funding was passed to the Natural Sciences and Engineering Research Council in 1977. Funding for university social science research handled by the Canada Council created in the 1957, was handed over to the newly established Humanities and Social Science Research Council in 1977.

In 1977 the Canadian Consortium for Research was established to promote funding for scientific research by post secondary institutions, government agencies and the private sector across Canada. It is composed of 22 member associations representing about 50,000 researchers in Canada and its activities are directed by a steering committee with members from the Canadian Association of Physicists, Canadian Association of University Teachers, Canadian Federation for the Humanities and Social Sciences, Canadian Federation of Biological Societies, Canadian Psychological Association and the Chemical Institute of Canada.

=== Disciplines (1945–1985) ===
==== Physics ====
The NRC continued atomic research at Chalk River Laboratories until the scale of activity necessitated its transfer to a newly created organization, Atomic Energy of Canada Limited, dedicated exclusively to atomic research, in 1952. Although Canada had the scientific, engineering and industrial means to design, built and test nuclear weapons, the government decided not to pursue this option. AECL took over responsibility for the operations of NRX but coincidentally shortly after the transfer that reactor experienced a serious accident. It was repaired and rebuilt. In 1957 AECL commissioned a new research facility, the heavy-water moderated and cooled National Research Universal Reactor (NRU) at Chalk River. In 1963 a new site, the Whiteshell Nuclear Research Establishment, became operational at Pinwa, Manitoba. Here a new organically cooled and operated research reactor was built and work was undertaken on the development of the Slow Poke reactor and the thorium fuel cycle. In 1978 research on the safe storage of nuclear waste was initiated.

In 1974, India detonated an atomic bomb with plutonium made from a commercial version of the NRX reactor, CIRUS, built in Bombay by AECL in 1956. As a result, the government of Canada terminated nuclear co-operation with that country.

The wartime research in physics and in particular the efforts of scientist, J.S. Foster, known for his work relating to the Stark effect, resulted in the establishment of the Radiation Laboratory at McGill equipped with Canada's first cyclotron (atom smasher) in 1949. Nuclear physicist J.M. Robson was the physics department head at McGill and R.E. Bell the head of the laboratory.

In the post war years at U of T, M.F. Crawford, H.L. Welsh, Elizabeth J. Allin and B.P. Stoicheff studied spectroscopy, optics and lasers. The early sixties saw the initiation of studies in atmospheric physics and K.G. McNeill and A.E. Litherland became active in high-energy particle physics research. H.E. Johns gained a reputation as a bio-physicist.

The University of British Columbia developed a notable presence in physics in the post-war years through the activities of professors G.M. Shrum, department head from 1938 to 1961, as well G.M. Volkoff, M. Bloom, R.D. Russell, J.B. Warren and others. Due to their efforts, the University of British Columbia was chosen as the site for the Tri-University Meson Facility, Canada's premier particle accelerator, in the seventies.

McMaster in Hamilton, Ontario also gained prominence under the leadership of physics department head, H.G. Thode whose studies in the field of mass spectrometry and isotopes paved the way for research in nuclear physics by M.W. Johns, H.E. Duckworth and B.N. Brockhouse at that institution. The first university research reactor in the Commonwealth was built at McMaster in 1957, followed by a particle-accelerator laboratory in the seventies. McMaster became renowned in fields including spectroscopy, solid state physics, biophysics and theoretical physics through the research of A.B. McLay, M.H. Preston, J. Carbotte and others.

Post-war francophone universities have also become important research centres. Physics at Laval advanced through the efforts of, F. Rasetti, from 1939 to 1947 and his colleague E. Persico, from 1947 to 1950. Others of note included J.L. Kerwin, P. Marmet and A. Boivin who undertook studies in the fields of nuclear and theoretical physics, atomic and molecular physics and optics. P. Demers, P. Lorrain and others at Université de Montréal studied nuclear and plasma physics.

The University of Manitoba saw growth after the war. Studies in nuclear physics undertaken by R.W. Pringle led to further research in that field by B.G. Hogg. Magnetism has been studied by A.H. Morrish. At the U of Saskatchewan, research in photonuclear physics and medical radiation therapy undertaken with Canada's first betatron (25 MeV) facility built in 1948 led to the development of a cobalt 60 apparatus by H. E. Johns and others. In 1964 the Saskatchewan Accelerator Laboratory (SAL) was completed and remained operational until 1999. It has since been integrated into the Canadian Light Source Synchrotron.

Physics at the University of Western Ontario in London received a boost during the war through the initiation of studies in radar by R.C. Dearle, G.A. Woonton and others. Post-war research in the field, under P.A. Forsyth, led to the establishment in 1967 of the Centre for Radio Science which included research into atmospheric and ionospheric physics. J.W. McGowan has undertaken studies in the scattering of positrons there.

The growth in physics during this period can be measured by the fact that 1075 doctorates in physics, almost a third of which were at the U of T, were awarded by 28 Canadian universities between 1974 and 1985.

==== Astronomy ====
Radio astronomy became a prominent feature of post war astronomy in Canada with the construction of the Algonquin Radio Observatory in Algonquin Park, Ontario in 1959. This facility built under the direction of noted astronomer Arthur Covington, featured a large 150-foot (46 m) receiving dish. The Dominion Radio Astrophysical Observatory in Penticton, British Columbia, built shortly thereafter, features an interferometric radio telescope, a 26-m single-dish antenna and a solar flux monitor. In 1962 another optical telescope, a 48-inch reflector fitted with a Coude focus and a room sized spectrograph, was added to the Dominion Astrophysical Observatory in Victoria. The establishment in 1975, of the Herzberg Institute for Astrophysics by the National Research Council of Canada consolidated the work of Canadian astronomy at the institution and this new organization became the prime mover for the construction of the new Canada-France-Hawaii Telescope, on Mount Mauna Kea in Hawaii, that saw first light in 1979.

==== Space science ====
Canada's initial achievements in space science came as a result of military initiatives. Because the effectiveness of radio communications and the huge air defence radar chains across Canada's north was affected by the electrical properties of the ionosphere, studies of those properties were undertaken in the fifties. In 1954, the Canadian Army built the Churchill Rocket Research Range in northern Manitoba for the launching of rockets with payloads designed to study the upper atmosphere. There were further launches in 1957 and 1958 as part of Canada's participation in the activities of the International Geophysical Year. The site was used by the National Research Council in the 1970s and 1980s for the launching of rockets as part of the Canadian Upper Atmosphere Research Programme.

In 1958, the newly formed NASA in the US sought international partners for its nascent satellite programme. The Canadian response came from the Defence Research Establishment where John Chapman proposed that Canada build a satellite to study the properties of the ionosphere from above (the rockets from Churchill studied them from below). NASA accepted the proposal, and the DRE in Ottawa, with the help of RCA in Montreal and SPAR Aerospace in Toronto, overcame daunting engineering difficulties and built Alouette I, a 145 kg. satellite which was launched by NASA from the Pacific Missile Test Range in California on 29 September 1962. Alouette I contributed significantly to the understanding of the electrical properties of the upper atmosphere. As a result of this success, Canada and the US signed an agreement relating to International Satellites for Ionospheric Studies, ISIS, and Canada launched Alouette II in 1965, ISIS I in 1969 and ISIS II in 1970.

==== Geology ====
Under the pressure of World War II the Survey redoubled efforts to find strategic mineral resources and map the territory of Canada. The exploration of western Canada received major attention with the discovery of oil at Leduc, Alberta in 1947 and Canada's world lead in atomic energy resulted in a successful search for uranium deposits in the north. The Survey's methods became more effective, as seen with the use of the helicopter which greatly accelerated the process of mapping. In 1955 the Survey launched "Operation Franklin" its largest field study up to that time. With air support and under the leadership of Y.O. Fortier the 28 member team mapped 260,000 square kilometers of the high Arctic. The Survey's reputation grew under the leadership of directors G. Hanson from 1953 to 1956 and J.M. Harrison, from 1956 to 1963. In 1966 organizational changes saw the Survey become part of the new Department of Energy, Mines and Resources and as a result new emphasis was placed on the quantitative analysis of Canada's mineral energy wealth. Land use became an important focus in the seventies with the Survey conducting studies of the environmental impact of the proposed Mackenzie Valley Pipeline corridor. During those same years, the extension of Canada's off-shore boundaries to include a new 371 kilometer economic zone increased the Survey's area of responsibility by 40 percent. To deal with the question of energy security the Survey initiated the Frontier Geoscience Program in the eighties. It also became the agent for Canada's participation in the international Ocean Drilling Program in 1984. That same year the Survey participated in the founding of Lithoprobe, the largest geoscience programme ever undertaken in Canada. This undertaking involving more than 700 scientists from, governments, universities and industry uses state-of-the-art techniques to provide a three dimensional image of the Earth's crust to an astonishing depth of 50 kilometers.

At the University of Toronto John Tuzo Wilson earned a worldwide reputation for his research into geological theory of plate tectonics.

==== Oceanography ====
In the post-war years the Hydrographic Survey continued its work with an expanded mandate. The entry of Newfoundland and Labrador into Confederation in 1949 saw the Survey's charting activities extended to the new coasts. As the air defence of Canada became of paramount importance in the fifties the Survey extended its research, to the Canadian Arctic, especially between 1954 and 1957 and charted routes for the ships carrying the supplies necessary to build the long range radar stations of the DEW Line. Arctic survey activity was further accelerated starting in 1959, the first year of the Polar Continental Shelf survey. The Fisheries Research Board continued its excellent work after the war and up until 1979 when it was disbanded as the result of government reorganization and its responsibilities passed to other organizations. The defence activities of the NRC during the war years, including anti-submarine warfare research were spun off and handed to the newly created Defence Research Board in 1947. That organization established research facilities in Halifax, Nova Scotia and Esquimalt, British Columbia to conduct studies in support of the ASW mission of the Royal Canadian Navy. Research activities focused on physical oceanography as it related to the transmission of sound underwater, including ocean temperature, salinity, currents, tides, surface noise and biological sound sources.

The signature event in the history of Canadian oceanography was the founding of the Bedford Institute of Oceanography in Halifax, Nova Scotia. Instrumental in the establishment was W. E. van Steenburgh, Director-General of Scientific Services of the Department of Mines and Technical Surveys, who recognized the need for scientific organization to deal with questions relating to defence, sovereignty, fisheries and the environment. As a result of his initiative the Institute and was created in 1962 and acquired the new state-of-the-art research vessel, the CCGS Hudson. In many ways the story of the Institute is the story of that ship. Launched in 1962 and commissioned in 1964 the Hudson undertook five geophysical surveys of the Mid-Atlantic Ridge, contributing to the understanding of the new theory of continental drift. In the 1966 the Hudson carried out a detailed survey of the Labrador Sea and studies of the Labrador current. The following year it surveyed the Denmark Strait. In 1970 the ship undertook the 11-month "Hudson '70" voyage, the first ever circumnavigation of North and South America, and in the latter part of the decade carried out the first surveys of the chemistry of Baffin Bay. In the eighties and nineties surveys within the framework of the international Joint Global Ocean Fluxes Study and World Ocean Circulation Experiment were completed by the Hudson. Other research projects included the 1983 Canadian Expedition to Study the Alpha Ridge (CESAR) off of Ellesmere Island.

==== Chemistry ====
University chemistry underwent explosive growth in the post-war years, especially in the sixties. The fifties saw the creation of six new universities each with a chemistry department, including, Le College Militaire Royal, 1952, Assumption, 1953, Sherbrooke, 1954, Carleton, 1957, York, 1959 and Waterloo, 1959. But during the sixties, nineteen new universities with their associated departments of chemistry, saw the light of day, including, Sir George Williams, 1960, Laurentien, 1960, Alberta at Calgary, 1960, Saskatchewan at Regina, 1961, Moncton, 1963, Victoria, 1963, Guelph, 1964, Brock, 1964, Trent, 1964, Lakehead, 1965, Simon Fraser, 1965, Lethbridge, 1967, Brandon,1967, Winnipeg, 1967, Quebec, 1969 and PEI, 1969. Laboratory work became more significant and saw the introduction of spectroscopy, mass spectrometry, nuclear magnetic resonance, flame photometry, and gas chromatography.

Original research blossomed during this period. In 1965 there were 664 doctoral students in chemistry at universities across Canada. This figure had jumped to 771 in 1966 and about 40% of the research was devoted to organic chemistry. By the same token in 1964 there were 19 graduate programmes in chemistry while a mere two years later there were 25. The spectacular growth is reflected in the evolution of graduate chemistry at the University of British Columbia where in 1955, seven professors supervised two graduate students compared to a faculty of 50 supervising 150 graduate students in 1968.

Research efforts of note included the work of R.U. Lemieux, at the University of Alberta, in the field of carbohydrate chemistry (1953), P.A. Giguere at Laval, in the field of hydrogen peroxide spectroscopy and N. Bartlett at the University of British Columbia in compounds of the so-called "inert" xenon.

The NRC Division of Chemistry continued its research throughout these years.

==== Biology ====
In the post war years the number of universities offering courses of one type or another in biology increased significantly as compared to the pre-war situation and stood at 41 in 1971. The post-war molecular biology revolution, the result of the connection between biochemistry and microbiology swept academia, with 10 universities offering at least both courses, including: Victoria, British Columbia, Alberta, Saskatchewan (Saskatoon), Manitoba, Western Ontario, Queen's, Ottawa, McGill, Montreal, Sherbrooke, Laval and Dalhousie. The NRC offered grants in support of animal, plant, cellular and population biology and in 1967 those universities receiving the most money included: British Columbia, $878,000, Guelph, $644,000, Toronto, $559,000, Alberta, $524, 000 and Manitoba, $519,000.

The excellent work of the Experimental Farms continued in the post war years. However change was in the wind and in 1959 the Experimental Farm Service was united with the Science Service to form the Research Branch of the Department of Agriculture. To complement the existing network of farms the new organization created a number of research institutes to deal with a variety of research topics including: genetics, microbiology, cell biology, entomology, plants, animals, soils and insect pathology. Of note was development of Canola by Canadian researchers Keith Downey and Baldur Stefansson in the 1970s.

In the post war years the research efforts of the Canadian Forestry Service continued. Of special note was the development of the Canadian Forest Fire Danger Rating System (CFFDRS) in the seventies and eighties as well as work with universities and the private sector to develop and commercialize Bacillus thuringiensis toxin (Bt) and other bio-pesticides.

Established in 1947 as the Dominion Wildlife Service and renamed the Canadian Wildlife Service in 1950, this organization has conducted research relating to Canada's large wild animals and the factors relating to their survival, for 60 years. These studies have investigated the state of elk, moose and bison in Canadian national parks as well as northern animals including caribou, muskox, polar bears, wolves and Arctic foxes. The organization has conducted research into the migratory patterns of ducks and geese, undertaken studies of shorebirds and seabirds, researched the songbird population, taken steps related to the conservation of the peregrine falcon, the whooping crane and the trumpeter swan and investigated the state of the fish populations in freshwater lakes. In more recent times it has conducted research in the field of environmental toxicology and the impact of toxins on wildlife.

==== Medical research ====
The Associate Committee of Medical Research created in 1936 to fund medical research in Canada became the Division of Medical Research in 1956 and the Medical Research Council in 1960. This organization funded medical research at a number of university medical schools and associated teaching hospitals across the country including Laval/Hôtel-Dieu de Québec, 1639, McGill/Montreal General Hospital, 1819, U of T/the Toronto General Hospital, 1829, Ottawa U/The Ottawa Hospital, 1845, Queen's/Hotel Dieu Hospital, Kingston, 1845, U of T/Hospital for Sick Children, Toronto, 1875, UBC/Vancouver General Hospital, 1886, Dalhousie/Victoria General Hospital, Halifax, 1887 and the U of A/ the University of Alberta Hospital, Edmonton, 1906.

The Connaught Laboratories in Toronto conducted groundbreaking research in the fifties with respect to the world's first polio vaccine. Working with Jonas Salk in the US, the laboratories developed a safe inactive vaccine using a new synthetic base, Medium 199. This permitted large volume production through a technique that came to be known as the "Toronto Method", which in turn allowed the mass vaccination campaigns of millions of Canadian and US children against polio beginning in 1954. The laboratory also produced the first trivalent Sabin live oral polio vaccine in 1959, as well as influenza, measles and a freeze-dried smallpox vaccine, which was of crucial importance in the global elimination of smallpox.

In Montreal, L'institute de microbologie continued its research in the fifties, and with a $1,000,000 grant from the Quebec government, began the production of polio vaccine in 1956. In the sixties the organization initiated research into immunology, in particular as related to organ transplants, as well as infectious mononucleosis, leprosy, cancer and measles. In 1975, the institute became part of the Université de Québec network and was renamed L'Institute Armand-Frappier.

The Hospital for Sick Children, associated with the University of Toronto, established its Research Institute in 1954. Since that time, through the work of the Institute, it has become Canada's most research intensive hospital and gained a reputation as one of the world leaders in science related to childhood ailments. The Ontario Cancer Institute (Princess Margaret Hospital), was founded in Toronto in 1958, for the treatment of cancer and cancer research.

The Ontario Heart and Stroke Foundation was formed in 1952, followed by a number of other provincial foundations during the fifties. In 1961, these foundations joined forces to form the Heart and Stroke Foundation of Canada. Since 1956, the Foundation has invested more than $1 billion in heart and stroke research in Canada. Canada's first heart transplant was performed on 31 May 1968 by Pierre Godin, the Chief Surgeon at the Montreal Heart Institute, on patient Albert Murphy of Chomedy, Quebec, a 59-year-old retired butcher suffering from degenerative heart disease. The operation took place about six months after the world's first, by Christiaan Barnard.

Research relating to in vitro fertilization has been undertaken since 1983 by IVF Canada, a private company established in Scarborough.

During these years, the Montreal Neurological Institute pioneered the development of medical imaging technologies, introducing Canada's first CAT scan in 1973, PET scan in 1975 and MRI in 1982.

In 1957, Canadian James Arthur Gairdner established the Gairdner Foundation, which introduced the annual Gairdner Foundation International Award to scientists for outstanding contributions in the field of medical research in 1959. The "Gairdner" is considered Canada's foremost international award, and as of 2008, 73 Gairdner recipients had gone on to win the Nobel Prize.

=== Big science (1945–1985) ===
The post-war years saw dramatic growth in "big science". In the fifties large atomic research reactors were built in Chalk River Ontario (NRX and NRU) and smaller ones in multiple universities across the country. Space research satellites (Alouette and ISIS) were built in Ottawa and launched in the US. Upper atmosphere Black Brant research rockets were launched from Churchill. A large state-of-the-art radio telescope was built in Algonquin Park.

Although plans to build an Intense Neutron Generator and a large astronomical telescope, to be named the Queen Elizabeth II in the sixties were canceled due to financial pressures (the latter in 1968), the seventies saw the construction of the TRIUMF large meson generator at the University of British Columbia, the Canada-France-Hawaii Telescope in Hawaii and the experimental Tokamak fusion reactor in Varennes, Quebec.

=== Science policy ===
The long-standing science policy of the Government of Canada has been to consider science and technology as supporting activities for the development of Canadian business and commerce. The first government science agencies, the Geological Survey of Canada (1842, minerals), the Dominion Experimental Farms (1886, agriculture), the Canadian Forest Service (1899 forestry), the Hydrographic Survey of Canada (1904, commercial navigation) and the Biological Board (1912, fisheries) were established to support their respective industries. The National Research Council (1916) was founded to support manufacturing research and to provide science and technology advice to the government and the Dominion Bureau of Statistics was created in 1917 to support economic development. The series of post-war NRC spin-offs saw this advisory role handed over to a newly created agency the Science Council of Canada founded in 1966. It provided scientific advice to the government until it was abolished in 1993 as part of federal budget cutbacks. In 2007 the federal government established the Science, Technology and Innovation Council (Canada) with a mandate to study and report on the state of science and technology in Canada as compared to the rest of the world.

Special circumstances, such as war, have seen the government mobilize science to deal with a national emergency.

The government has also for the last fifty years considered the health and more recently the public safety of Canadians to be of great importance and has therefore invested in medical research through the NRC, the Medical Research Board and lately the Canadian Institutes of Health Research. Other health and safety science activities include the laboratory investigations of Health Canada, the Public Health Agency of Canada and the Canadian Food Inspection Agency.

However government policy with respect to what might be described "pure" science has been ambiguous. Early in the twentieth century the government funded the construction of one of the largest astronomical telescopes in the world. Other "big science" projects such as those listed here have also been funded over the last one hundred years. However, when the overall funding for this type of activity during the past century is considered there has been a notable lag when Canada's efforts are compared to those of other countries.

=== Nobel laureates and other scientists of note (1945–1985) ===
A number of Nobel Prizes were awarded to Canadian scientists during this period, including: William Giauque (Chemistry, 1949), Charles B. Huggins (Physiology or Medicine, 1966), Gerhard Herzberg (Chemistry, 1971) and David H. Hubel (Physiology or Medicine, 1981).

Other scientists of note included: Carlyle Smith Beals, 1899–1979 (astronomy), Edgar William Richard Steacie, 1900–1962 (chemistry), Helen Sawyer Hogg, 1905–1993 (astronomy), John Tuzo Wilson, 1908–1993 (geology), Marshall McLuhan, 1911–1980 (sociology/communications), Pierre Dansereau, 1911 (ecology), Harold Copp, 1915–1998 (medicine), Raymond Lemieux, 1920–2000 (chemistry), Fernand Seguin, 1922–1988 (biochemistry, TV personality), Charles Scriver, 1930 (medicine), Hubert Reeves, 1932 (cosmology) and David Suzuki, 1936 (genetics, TV personality).

== Integrationism ==
In the late 20th century, there arose a perception of the limits of reductionism as a philosophy for the understanding of the natural world, as well as an appreciation that greater knowledge could be gained by examining the way that the component parts of the natural world fit together, relate to each other and influence each other. This has led to a movement whereby the knowledge of nature gained through 300 years of reductionist-inspired scientific research is being integrated in ways that allow the understanding of these complex relationships. While Canadian scientists still operate very much in the reductionist mode, integrationism has developed as a parallel philosophy especially in fields such as biology and cognitive science. It is evident also in the creation of multidisciplinary structures such at the MaRS Discovery District in Toronto.

=== Cutbacks and recovery (1985–present) ===
==== Universities and government research agencies (1985–present) ====
Growth continued until the mid-eighties when a crisis in public funding curtailed much scientific research at the university and government level. Space activities spread across federal departments were brought under the roof of the Canadian Space Agency, created in 1989. The province of Quebec established the Centre de recherche industriel de Québec that same year. The Defence Research Board was reorganized and emerged as Defence Research and Development Canada in 2000.

The last two decades have witnessed a slow but steady recovery. The mid-nineties saw the voluntary creation of the Group of Ten, large research universities in Canada. Three members were added to create the Group of 13 in 2006. In 1995, the Social Science Federation of Canada and the Canadian Federation for the Humanities amalgamated to form the Canadian Federation for the Humanities and Social Sciences.

In 1982, the virtual, Ottawa-based Canadian Institute for Advanced Research was established to investigate questions relating to the fundamental nature of the universe in fields such as cosmology, gravity, quantum mechanics and genetics. The formation in 2001 of the Perimeter Institute for the study of quantum mechanics and relativity in Waterloo, Ontario represents the initiative of a private individual (the founder of Research in Motion, the company that invented the BlackBerry) who has entered a field previously occupied by public institutes.

==== Funding agencies, science policy and science infrastructure (1985–present) ====
This period has seen the establishment of structures designed to enhance scientific research in Canada. Funding agencies established previously have continued to provide money for research projects. They have been joined by new agencies designed to purchase equipment related to this research as well as pay the salaries of new researchers. Technical facilities for research communications and computing and their related associations have also been created.

In 1989, Canada's three principal funding agencies, the Natural Sciences and Engineering Research Council of Canada, the Social Sciences and Humanities Research Council of Canada, and the Medical Research Council of Canada Research and Industry Canada, established the Network of Centres of Excellence (NCE) programme to help commercialize the results of Canadian scientific discovery. The closely related Centres of Excellence for Commercialization and Research (CECR) programme, as well as the Business-Led Networks of Centres of Excellence (BL-NCE) programme, were created in 2007. CECRs established include the Advanced Applied Physics Solutions Inc. – AAPS, Vancouver, BC ($14.95 million), the Bioindustrial Innovation Centre – BIC, Sarnia, ON ($14.95 million) and Centre for the Commercialization of Research – CCR, Ottawa, ON ($14.95 million). Medical CECRs have also been created (see medical research below).

In 1997, the federal government created the Canada Foundation for Innovation with an endowment of $800 million to help finance the acquisition of scientific research material, equipment and facilities by Canadian universities. Since its creation the Canada Foundation for Innovation has invested large sums in a number of major projects, including the Canadian Light Source (University of Saskatchewan), the International Facility for Underground Science (Carleton University), NEPTUNE Canada's cable-linked seafloor observatory (University of Victoria), the Centre for Cellular and Biomolecular Research (University of Toronto), the Centre for Integrated Genomics (B.C. Cancer Agency), a Canadian Research Icebreaker (Université Laval), the McGill University Health Centre Life Sciences Complex (McGill University), the Toronto Centre for Comparative Models of Human Disease (Mount Sinai Hospital), the Advanced Laser Light Sources (ALLS) (Institut national de la recherche scientifique) and the National Site Licensing Project (University of Ottawa).

In 2000, the Canada Research Chair Programme was established to help finance the hiring of scientists for Canadian university research. Further developments saw the establishment of both the Indirect Cost Program and the Canada Graduate Scholarship Program in 2003 and the CFI Research Hospital Fund in 2004.

The Government of Alberta established the Alberta Heritage Foundation for Medical Research, with an endowment of $300,000,000, in 1980. By 2000 the endowment was valued at $600,000,00. In 2000, using a similar model, the government established the Alberta Heritage Foundation for Science and Engineering Research with support for 172 researchers and an endowment valued at $1 billion. In 1999, the Medical Research Council was reorganized and emerged as the new Canadian Institutes of Health Research.

In recent years, university endowments (see List of Canadian universities by endowment) have played an increasingly important role in funding university activity including scientific research. Those universities with the largest endowments (in millions of C$) include the University of Toronto at $2,490 (2007), the University of British Columbia at $1,010 (2007), McGill University at $973.6 (2007), the University of Alberta at $751.5 (2007), Queen's University at $660.0 (2007), McMaster University at $498.5 (2007), the University of Calgary at $426.0 (2007), Dalhousie University at $364.0 (2006), York University at $306.0 (2007) and the University of Manitoba at $303.0 (2006).

The Canadian Advanced Network and Research for Industry and Education (CANARIE) was established in 1993 to facilitate research cooperation among Canadian scientists. CANARIE maintains a communications network known as CA*NET, originally created in 1990 with the support of the National Research Council of Canada, which is used for the high-speed/high volume transfer of research data among its members. Members of CANARIE include Canadian universities, research institutes and research-intensive corporations.

The C3.ca Association Inc. was formed in 1997 to promote and integrate high performance computing (supercomputing) among Canada's research universities. Member associations included the Atlantic Computational Ecellence Network (ACEnet), Consortium Laval, UQAM, McGill and Eastern Quebec (CLUMEQ), the Réseau québécois de calcul de haute performance (RQCHP), the High Performance Computing Virtual Laboratory (HPCVL), SciNet, the Shared Hierarchical Academic Research Computing NETwork (SHARCNET) and the Western Canada Research Grid (WestGrid). In 2008, the Association became known as Compute Canada. In 2011, CLUMEQ and RQCHP merged into Calcul Québec, which is now one of the six remaining regional consortia part of Compute Canada.

The Canadian Academies of Science was established in 2004, as the result of an initiative by the Royal Society of Canada, the Canadian Academy of Engineering and the Canadian Institute of Academic Medicine. The purpose of the organization is to act as "a source of independent, expert assessment of the science underlying pressing issues and matters of public interest". The organization was renamed in 2006 and became known as the Council of Canadian Academies. In 2009, the Academies published a report on innovation in Canada entitled "Innovation and Business Strategy: Why Canada Falls Short".

The Government of Canada created the Canada Excellence Research Chairs (CERC) programme in 2008. With an annual budget of $28 million, the CERC funds 20 research chairs in Canadian universities, to attract the world's most accomplished researchers in a number of fields, including information and communication, environmental science, energy and life science. The first chairholders were announced in May 2010.

==== Disciplines (1985–present) ====
===== Physics =====
Atomic fusion was a significant field of study in this period. From 1987 to 1999 at Varennes, Quebec, Hydro-Québec operated a Tokamak fusion reactor. Researchers from the Institut de recherche en électricité du Québec (IREQ) and the Institut national de la recherche scientifique (INRS) investigated various elements of fusion science at this facility.

The Sudbury Neutrino Observatory (SNO) studied the nature of the sub-atomic particle known as the neutrino from 1999 until 2006. The facility is located about 2 km underground in the former Creighton nickel mine of CVRD Inco in Sudbury, Ontario and was designed to detect solar neutrinos by sensing their interaction with deuterium nuclei and atomic electrons. Observations resulted in a major discovery, demonstrating among other things that solar neutrinos oscillate as they travel through space and therefore have mass. The facility is undergoing an upgrade that will result in SNO+ that will permit new experiments. These will involve the study of the proton proton chain reaction, geo-neutrinos (neutrinos produced by natural phenomena in the Earth) and neutrinoless double beta decay. As of 2010, the facility was home to two major experiments investigating the nature of dark matter: the Project in Canada to Search for Supersymmetric Objects (PICASSO), which is attempting to find evidence for the existence of WIMPS (weakly interacting massive particles) and the Dark Matter Experiment Using Argon Pulse (DEAP). There are also plans by the US-based Cryogenic Dark Matter Search team to use the SNO facility for dark matter research.

One of the largest science projects in Canadian history, the Canadian Light Source Synchrotron at the University of Saskatchewan in Saskatoon, began operation in 2004. Covering an area the size of a football field and built at a cost of $175 million, it is operated by CLS Inc., a University of Saskatchewan not-for-profit corporation. It is used to investigate the nature of matter at very small scales. Similar in nature but smaller in scale the Advanced Laser Light Source (ALLS), was established in Quebec City at the facilities of the Institut national de recherche scientifique (University of Quebec) in 2004. The $20 million, CFI-funded international project uses a multi-beam femtosecond laser system operating in a wide range of frequencies to study the behaviour of molecules at extremely high speeds. The CFI has also provided funding for Canadian physicists to participate in research at the Spallation Neutron Source facility at the Oak Ridge National Laboratory in the US. The money will permit the design and construction of Vulcan, a spallation neutron beam source, and a spectrometer, as well as a guarantee of beam time access.

Small scale physics is also the focus of the National Institute for Nanotechnology (NINT) at the University of Alberta, in Edmonton, Alberta. Operated by the NRC, the institute was created in 2001 and moved into a state-of-the-art facility among the largest and quietest of its type in the world in 2006. It will study a wide range of nanoscale phenomena, including the synthesis of nanocrystals, nanowires and supramolecular-based nanomaterials, the fabrication of molecular-scale devices, the development of nano-scaled materials for chemical reactions at semiconductor surfaces, protein design, genetic engineering and nanoelectromechanical systems. Of particular recent note is the Waterloo Institute for Nanotechnology, which will be in operation in 2011 conducting research related to nano-engineered materials, nano-electronics design and fabrication, nano-instrumentation and nano-biosystems. An example of one of the nanofabrication projects associated with the Waterloo Institute for Nanotechnology is the University of Waterloo Nano Robotics Group. The group, composed only of undergraduate students, is developing a research paper characterizing the surface tension around micro robots at a micro scale after winning first place at the 2011 Mobile Microrobotics Challenge. It was the only team composed completely of undergraduates (as well as the only Canadian team) competing.

In 2008, the Canadian Centre for Electron Microscopy at McMaster University, in Hamilton, Ontario, acquired the Titan 80–300 Cubed electron microscope. The instrument is considered the best at any university in the world by the Director of the Centre, permitting the detailed examination of individual atoms, which is useful in the field of nanotechnological research.

The University of Toronto is the most prominent member of the G13 Canadian research universities and remains one of Canada's premier physics research organizations. In 1997, the physics department celebrated the centenary of its graduate programme. In 2007, it conducted research in a wide-ranging number of fields, including planetary physics, quantum optics and condensed matter physics and subatomic physics. A number of research institutes play an important part in this activity, including the Center for Quantum Information and Quantum Control, the Institute for Optical Sciences, the Canadian Institute for Theoretical Astrophysics (C.I.T.A.), Photonics Research Ontario, IsoTrace, the Institute for Aerospace Studies, the Institute of Particle Physics (I.P.P.) and the Department of Astronomy and Astrophysics.

The University of British Columbia continues to play an important role in physics research. Fields of study include applied physics, atomic, molecular and optical physics, biophysics, condensed matter, medical physics, particle, subatomic and string theory and theoretical physics. Important research institutes include the Advanced Materials and Process Engineering Laboratory, the Pacific Institute of Theoretical Physics and of course TRIUMF, Canada's National Laboratory for Particle and Nuclear Physics.

TRIUMF is also Canada's centre for participation in the construction and eventual operation of the Large Hadron Collider at CERN in Geneva. Canadian universities and Canadian industry have contributed components to ATLAS, one of that accelerators large particle detectors. TRIUMF also hosts a Tier 1 Computing Centre for ATLAS, one of ten in the world.

Canada's number three research university, the University of Alberta in Edmonton, maintains its strong position in physics research in Canada in 2008. Fields of study include the astrophysical sciences, condensed matter physics, geophysics and particle physics. Research institutes of note include: the Center for Nanoscale Physics, the Centre for Particle Physics (Center for Subatomic Research), the Institute for Geophysical Research, the Mitpan International Institute of Earthquake Prediction Theory, the Space Physics Laboratory and the Theoretical Physics Institute.

The reputation of physics research at McGill in Montreal continues to be strong. Fields of study include astrophysics, condensed matter physics, high energy physics, nuclear physics and nonlinear physics. Research centres of note include: the Centre for the Physics of Materials, the Centre for High Energy Physics, the Interuniversity Centre for Subatomic Physics, and the McGill Institute for Advanced Materials.

Arguably, Canada's most significant theoretical physics research organization is the newly created Perimeter Institute (PI), associated with the University of Waterloo in Waterloo, Ontario. Founded in 1999 by Mike Lazaridis, inventor of the BlackBerry, and under the leadership of Founding Executive Director Howard Burton, the 60 resident researchers have since 2001 conducted research in a number of fields, including cosmology, particle physics, quantum foundations, quantum gravity, quantum information and superstring theory. In 2008 the Institute announced the appointment of Stephen Hawking to the position of Perimeter Institute Distinguished Research Chair. Hawking, began his private research at the PI in June 2010. In 2009, the Perimeter institute made public plans for the construction of the new Stephen Hawking Centre, which will double the size of the institute.

The closely related Institute for Quantum Computing was established at the University of Waterloo in 2002 with $100 million in funding and construction of a dedicated facility was begun in June 2008. Under the direction of Michele Mosca, the Institute aims to have 30 full-time researchers, 50 post-doctoral fellows and 125 graduate students aggressively conducting research into the application of quantum mechanical techniques to information processing systems. The Institute operates a number of highly advanced laboratories including the Atom Trapping Laboratory, the Integrated Quantum Optoelectronics Laboratory, the Josephson Junctions Laboratory and the Photonic Entanglement Laboratory.

===== Astronomy =====
Cutbacks in funding hit Canada's premier astronomical research organization the Herzberg Institute of Astrophysics hard. Money could not be found to resurface the Algonquin Park Radio Telescope and it along with the solar telescope near Ottawa were closed in 1986. However that same year, the HIA did establish the Canadian Astronomy Data Centre (CADC) which created special software for the archiving of astronomical date. In 1987, the HAI took a 25 percent stake in the 15-m James Clerk Maxwell Telescope (submillimetre radio) and in the nineties a 15 percent stake in the optical 8 metre Gemini Telescope, which became operational in 1999. Headquarters for the HIA moved from Ottawa to Victoria in 1995. In the 21st century, the Institute designed instruments for its international telescope programme, including the Gemini multi-object spectrograph, the JCMT auto-correlation spectrometer and imaging system and the CFHT adaptive optics bonnette. Of note is the initiation of the CFHT Legacy Survey in 2003. Using the telescope's wide field Megacam the survey consists of three studies, "Very Wide", "Wide", and "Deep", and investigates a number of phenomena including the nature of dark matter and dark energy. The University of Calgary is participating in the development of the software to be used for data acquisition and image production at the Atacama Large Millimeter Array Telescope under construction in the Atacama Desert in Chile. First light is expected in 2011.

The HAI is also the principal player in the 1998–1999 Long-Range Plan for Astronomy and has moved towards a more supportive role for Canadian university astronomy.

In 2003, the Canadian Space Agency launched Canada's first astronomical satellite, the Microvariability and Oscillations of STars telescope or MOST, developed by the Agency, Dynacon Enterprises Limited and the astronomy departments at the University of Toronto and British Columbia.

The Department of Astronomy and Astrophysics at the University of Toronto conducts wide-ranging research using some of the world's premier observatories. Fields of study include cosmology, the early universe, galaxy clusters, galaxy and star formation, planet formation, the interstellar medium, high energy astrophysics and stellar structure and evolution. Researchers at the department have access to major telescopes, including Gemini North and South (8.1 m), Magellan (6.5 m), the CFHT (3.6 m), Dupont (2.5 m) and the JCMT (sub-mm). Research in the department also utilizes other optical, radio and satellite facilities and the use of stratospheric balloons for galactic and cogsmological research. In 2008, three astronomers from the university used the Gemini North telescope to capture one of the first direct images of an extrasolar planet candidate orbiting the star 1RSX J160929.1-210524, located approximately 500 light years from earth.

Astronomy research in the 21st century is combined with the work of the physics department at the University of British Columbia. The 22 staff researchers there engage in an active programme of investigation and have access to cutting edge facilities including the CFHT and Gemini telescopes. The Dominion Astrophysical Observatory near Victoria and the two radio telescopes of the Dominion Radio Astrophysical Observatory near Penticton are also used. Furthermore, department members have built several liquid mirror telescopes, the biggest being the 6 metre Large Zenith Telescope near Vancouver.

The Origins Institute, founded in 2004 at McMaster University by Dr Ralph Pudritz, has initially focused its research on the structure of extra solar systems but has plans to expand its endeavours to include studies relating to the origins of the universe and life.

Other Canadian universities, including Queen's, York, Calgary, the University of Alberta, the University of Victoria, Montreal, Laval and the University of Western Ontario offer graduate astronomy programmes and have their own observatories.

In 2009, the Canadian Astronomy Data Centre (CADC) at the NRC Herzberg Institute of Astrophysics (NRC-HIA) in Victoria, announced the establishment of the Canadian Advanced Network for Astronomical Research (CANFAR). This system will create an electronic bridge linking the software of Canadian astronomers with the powerful computers of the CANARIE network. The University of British Columbia and University of Victoria are major participants in the project which will enhance collaboration and productivity among Canadian researchers in astronomy.

In recent years there have been plans for the dramatic renewal of Canadian observing facilities in both the visible and radio spectrum. In the visible spectrum, running from the near-ultraviolet to the mid-infrared (0.31 to 28 μm), the Thirty Meter Telescope project calls for the construction of a telescope with a mirror an astonishing 30 metres in diameter. The telescope is the result of a partnership, established in 2003, between the Association of Canadian Universities for Research in Astronomy (ACURA), the California Institute of Technology and the University of California. Funding is provided by the Gordon and Betty Moore Foundation, in the US as well as the Canada Foundation for Innovation, the Ontario Ministry of Research and Innovation, the National Research Council of Canada, the Natural Sciences and Engineering Research Council of Canada, the British Columbia Knowledge Development Fund and Association of Universities for Research in Astronomy (AURA). First light for the C$1 billion facility on Mauna Kea in Hawaii is planned for 2017. The telescope will investigate a number of cutting edge phenomena including: dark energy, dark matter and the Standard Model of particle physics, the first stars and galaxies in the Universe, reionization, galaxy assembly and evolution, planet and star formation and the possibility life on planets outside the Solar System.

Canadian universities and scientists are also participating in another international partnership for the construction of new telescope for radio astronomy. The University of Calgary is Canada's lead institution for Canadian participation in the Square Kilometer Array. Construction of the €1.5 billion telescope in the southern hemisphere, is scheduled to begin in 2013, with first light in 2017 and full operation scheduled for 2022.

===== Space science =====
During this period, Canadian space science developed a crewed component in addition to uncrewed activities. In the early eighties, the government of Canada signed an agreement with the US regarding participation by Canada in the NASA Space Shuttle programme. Canada would design, build and donate four Remote Manipulator System devices, (popularly known as the Canadarm), used to handle cargo and equipment in the bay of the shuttle when it was in orbit, in exchange for the training of a Canadian astronaut corps by NASA and the assignment of Canadian astronauts as crew members aboard Space Shuttle flights. Shuttle flights have included those by Marc Garneau, Canada's first astronaut (1984/1996/2000,) Roberta Bondar (1992), Steve MacLean (1992/2006), Chris Hadfield (1995/2001), Robert Thirsk (1996), Bjarni Tryggvason (1997), Dave Williams (1998) and Julie Payette (1999/2009). In 2009, the CSA announced the appointment of two new members of the Canadian Astronaut Corps, Jeremy Hansen and David St-Jacques. Also in 2009, Robert Thirsk undertook a six-month mission aboard the International Space Station, the first long duration flight by a Canadian astronaut. Science studies during these missions have involved investigations of human physiology including space sickness, intracorporal fluid displacements, spatial orientation and the loss of bone and muscle mass during prolonged periods of weightlessness. There have also been experiments in materials science and biology, amongst others. In September 2010, Veteran Canadian astronaut Chris Hadfield was appointed commander of the International Space Station for a mission in 2012.

Canada's uncrewed programme included the first launching of the Canadian earth observation satellite RADARSAT-1 in 1995, and an improved version, RADARSAT-2, in 2007. Placed in polar orbits, each of these satellites images almost all of the Earth's surface every 24 days using a powerful synthetic aperture radar, SAR. The images have both operational and scientific applications, and their data is of use in geology, hydrology, agriculture, cartography, forestry, climatology, urbanology, environmental studies, meteorology, oceanography and other fields. In 2009, the Canadian Space Agency announced a follow-up programme, RADARSAT Constellation, which will see the launching of three Earth observation satellites in 2014, 2015 and 2016 respectively, working as a trio to provide complete coverage of Canada's land and ocean surfaces as well as 95% of the surface of the world every 24 hours.

The Canadian Space Agency launched the Microvariability and Oscillations of STars (MOST) astronomical and SCISAT-1, satellites in 2003. A year, later MOST observed that the star, Procyon, did not oscillate, a finding that has importance with respect to theories relating to the formation and aging of the Sun and other stars.

Canadian instruments have also flown aboard a number of international satellites. Akebono, a Japanese satellite launched in 1989 to study the Earth's magnetosphere, was equipped with the Canadian suprathermal ion mass spectrometer. In 1996, the Canadian auroral ultra-violet imager, flew aboard the Russian satellite Interball-2. FUSE, an international ultraviolet space observatory launched in 1999, has aboard the Canadian-designed and built Fine Error Sensor camera system for tracking the telescope. Canada provided the $37 million "weather station" aboard the Phoenix Mars uncrewed mission scheduled to land on that planet in 2008.

In 2008, the Agency plans to launch a hybrid satellite, Cassiope, which includes a scientific package equipped with the "enhanced polar outflow probe" that will study the ionosphere. The Agency has also coordinated Canada's contribution to the HIFI and SPIRE instruments aboard the Herschel Space Observatory and to the Low Frequency Instrument and the High Frequency Instrument aboard the Planck astronomical/cosmological satellite both launched in 2008. Finally, Canada is contributing the Fine Guidance Sensor and Tuneable Filter Imager for the James Webb Space Telescope launched in 2022.

In 2008, the Canadian Space Agency also announced plans to design and launch the Near Earth Object Surveillance Satellite (NEOSat) in 2010. Weighing 65 kg and about the size of a large suitcase, the satellite, which will optically search space near the earth with its 15 cm telescope for asteroids that represent a danger to the planet through collision, will be the first dedicated to this task. It will also search for and track smaller objects that could represent a lesser but nevertheless significant danger. The $12 million machine is being designed and built by the University of Calgary and Dynacon Inc. of Mississauga, Ontario. It will be placed in a Sun-synchronous polar orbit about 800 km above the Earth. In November 2008, the Agency signed a $40 million 16-month contract with MacDonald Dettwiler and Associates Ltd. of Vancouver to begin the design of the RADARSAT Constellation (three satellite) mission. In the 2009 federal budget, the agency was awarded funding for the preliminary design of robotic lunar/Martian rovers.

The University of Toronto operates the Canadian Advanced Nanospace eXperiment Program. In 2009, the University of Calgary and the University of Lethbridge established the Institute for Space Imaging Science, a Canadian first.

A rather imaginative recent undertaking is one by the Mars Society, an international non-profit space advocacy organization and its Canadian branch, the Mars Society of Canada, which established the Flashline Mars Arctic Research Station (FMARS) as part of their Mars Analogue Research Station Programme near the Haughton Meteor Impact Crater on Devon Island, Nunavut in 2002. Designed to develop procedures for an eventual crewed mission to Mars, the "crew members" inhabit a simulated Mars base and wear simulated space suits to conduct microbiological and geological studies and simulated Mars field explorations.

===== Geology =====
The Geological Survey has continued its research during this period. In 1986, the Survey merged with the Earth Physics Branch of the Department of Energy, Mines and Resources and acquired the national seismology and geomagnetic observatory networks of that organization. In the nineties, this new organization took the lead in the development of the National Geoscience Mapping Program (NATMAP) with other governments, universities and industries to optimize the use of funding for the new mapping of bedrock and surface geology of Canada. Activity in environmental studies has involved establishing norms for the geochemical profiles of naturally occurring substances and work with respect to climate change as well as hydrogeology and natural radioactivity and the risks associated with natural dangers, including earthquakes and tsunamis. The Intergovernmental Geoscience Accord, signed in 1996, clarified the role of the Survey with respect to relations with provincial and territorial governments. As the result of a reorganization, the Survey became part of the Earth Sciences division of Natural Resources Canada in the mid-nineties. In recent years, the evolution of digital electronics and the Internet has seen the Survey undertake the development of the Geoscience Knowledge Network with the aim of making geological information available online. The budget of the Survey is now about $60 million a year, and the staff of 550 are located at headquarters in Ottawa and regional offices in Dartmouth, Nova Scotia, St. Foy, Quebec, Calgary, Alberta and Sidney and Vancouver, British Columbia. Present fields of study include geological hazards and environmental geoscience, marine geoscience, minerals, hydrocarbons and bedrock and surficial geoscience.

In 2008, the oldest rocks yet discovered on earth, estimated to be about 4.28 billion years old were found along the east shore of Hudson Bay in Quebec. Also in 2008, a two-year project involving seven arctic nations and led by scientist Marc St. Onge of the Geological Survey of Canada, completed a survey that mapped the geology of the polar region.

===== Oceanography =====
Because most oceanographic activity in Canada is federally funded, the cutbacks of 1985 affected scientific research in this field. For example, the Pacific Ocean research facilities of the Defence Research Board were closed. However, in spite of this, the Bedford Institute of Oceanography has maintained its status as Canada's premier oceanographic institution. Consolidation over the years has brought the oceanographic activities of four departments under the roof of the Institute, and at the present time, over 400 scientists, engineers, technicians, support staff and others conduct targeted research in a number of fields. National Defence activities support ocean surveillance through the Maritime Forces Atlantic's Route Survey Office and focus on surveys of the sea floor in areas of military interest. The Shellfish Section of Environment Canada conducts ocean water quality surveys and microbiological studies of shellfish. The Geological Survey of Canada is also present and has established itself as Canada's principal marine geoscience facility with emphasis on geophysics, geochemistry, marine and petroleum geology and the coastal/off-shore landmass. The Science Division and Canadian Hydrographic Service of the Department of Fisheries and Oceans are also represented. Associated researchers study the marine climate and environment, marine and diadromous fish, shellfish, mammals and plants. The institute operates four research vessels, CCGS Matthew acquired in 1990 along with the famous CCGS Hudson (1964), CCGS Navicula (1968) and CCGS Alfred Needler (1982).

At the Maurice Lamontagne Institute established in 1987 near Mont-Joli, Quebec, on the St. Lawrence Estuary, more than 400 staff undertake research relating to the protection of the marine environment and the conservation of aquatic plants and animals.

Beginning in 2006, the federal government intensified research of the mapping of the ocean floor in the high arctic as part of a programme designed to reinforce Canada's claim to the arctic. The study of the Lomonosov Ridge has been a particular focus of attention.

The Ocean Tracking Network, headquartered at Dalhousie University in Halifax was established in 2008, with $168 million in funding provided by the Canada Foundation for Innovation and the Natural Sciences and Engineering Research Council. The project seeks to establish a worldwide animal surveillance and ocean monitoring network using acoustic sensors that will allow the tracking of tagged marine animals for up to 20 years. The information gathered will be used for marine ecological protection. In 2009, on the west coast, the NEPTUNE Program at the University of Victoria established the world's first regional cabled ocean observatory. Through the use of sensors connected to an 800 km electro-optical cable resting on the seabed of the Juan de Fuca Plate, scientists can study seismic activity, ocean-climate interactions and seafloor ecology. Canadian researchers have also made important contributions to the International Census of Marine Life, cataloguing 2636 species in the Pacific, 3160 in the Atlantic, and 3038 species in the Arctic Oceans in recent years.

===== Chemistry =====
Although there have been funding difficulties, the Group of Thirteen Canadian research universities have been engaged in cutting-edge chemistry research during this period.

Not surprisingly, the University of Toronto has an elaborate graduate research programme with specialties in analytical chemistry, biological and organic chemistry, environmental chemistry, inorganic chemistry, physical chemistry, chemical physics and polymer chemistry. The University of British Columbia has a similarly well-developed chemistry research programme in fields such as analytical chemistry, biochemistry, environmental chemistry, inorganic chemistry, material, organic chemistry, physical-theoretical chemistry and nuclear and radiochemistry.

The University of Alberta has a number of advanced laboratories supporting research in chemistry. These include the Analytical and Instrumentation Laboratory, the Mass Spectrometry Laboratory, the Nuclear Magnetic Resonance Laboratory and the X-ray Crystallography Laboratory which support, analytical chemistry, chemical biology, chemical physics, inorganic chemistry, materials and surface chemistry, nanotechnology, organic chemistry, physical chemistry and theoretical and computational chemistry.

In recent years, McGill has emphasized the increasingly interdisciplinary nature of chemical research in fields such as analytical/environmental chemistry, biological chemistry, chemical physics, materials chemistry and synthesis/catalysis.

Advanced laboratories combined with a multidisciplinary approach characterize chemistry research at the University of Waterloo. Of note is the new Waterloo Advanced Technology laboratory or WATlLab, a facility that offers researchers, microscopy and lithography, spectromicroscopy and spectroscopy and nanofabrication and materials science tools. Also available is the Waterloo Chemical Analysis Facility, which includes NMR and mass spectrometry machines. Research institutes include the Guelph-Waterloo Centre for Graduate Work in Chemistry and Biochemistry and the Institute of Biochemistry and Molecular Biology.

The NRC continues its work in chemistry, notably at the Steacie Institute for Molecular Sciences with laboratories in Ottawa (Sussex Drive) and Chalk River, Ontario.

===== Biology =====
Biology in the new century has been characterized by the rise of systems and synthetic biological research centres in universities across Canada. A recent phenomenon, systems biology, is the result of the merger of molecular and cell biology with systems and control theory and seeks to explain how the higher level characteristics of complex biological systems, including life itself, arise from the interactions among their component parts. Research results have significant implications for the pharmaceutical and biotechnology industries.

One notable center is the University of Calgary's Institute for Biocomplexity and Informatics. The Chairman of the Institute, Stuart Kauffman has contributed to the field of abiogenisis with his research into the emergence of metabolism through phenomena involving autocatalytic sets. Others centres of note in Ontario include the Department of Cellular and Systems Biology and the Terrence Donnelly Centre for Cellular and Biomolecular Research at the University of Toronto, the Centre for Computational Biology at the Hospital for Sick Children in Toronto, the Sun Centre of Excellence in Systems Biology at the Samuel Lunenfeld Research Institute (Mount Sinai Hospital) in Toronto and the Ottawa Institute of Systems Biology (2005) at the University of Ottawa. The Biotron research facility, opened in 2008 at the University of Western Ontario, in London, will provide a unique laboratory for the study of basic biological systems at the ecological, physiological and molecular levels. In Quebec, McGill has established the Centre for Nonlinear Dynamics in Physiology and Disease. The prairie provinces are home to a number of organizations, including the Manitoba Centre for Proteomics and Systems Biology and the Centre for Mathematical Biology and the Institute for Biomolecular Design, both at the University of Alberta. The latter has initiated the 10-year Project Cyber Cell to develop the computer simulation of a living cell, in this case an E. coli bacterium, involving 40 laboratories across Canada. The Canadian Laboratories in Integrated Proteolysis have been created at the University of British Columbia. A reflection of the growth of the discipline is seen in the establishment of the Canadian Society for Systems Biology in 2006. Membership stands at 150 in 2008.

Research in cloning was undertaken during these years. In 1999, McGill University produced the world's first cloned goats. In 2001, veterinary doctor Lawrence Smith of the University of Montreal cloned three calves.

After significant cutbacks and reorganization, biological research at the National Research Council has recovered and is reflected in the activities of a number of sub-organizations, including the Institute for Biological Sciences (NRC-IBS) in Ottawa, Montreal Road and Sussex Drive Campuses, the Biotechnology Research Institute (NRC-BRI) in Montreal, Quebec, the Institute for Biodiagnostics (NRC-IBD) with facilities in Winnipeg, Manitoba, Calgary, Alberta and Halifax, Nova Scotia, the Plant Biotechnology Institute (NRC-PBI) in Saskatoon, Saskatchewan and the Institute for Marine Biosciences (NRC-IMB) in Halifax, Nova Scotia.

Since 1985, federal research activities in the field of agriculture have continued. The 600 scientists and technicians of the Research Branch of Agriculture and Agri-Food Canada undertake studies in a wide variety of fields at 19 research stations across Canada, including but not limited to the Pacific Agri-Food Research Centre, Agassiz and Summerland.

In recent years, the Canadian Forest Service has investigated the process of tissue culture. Through a technique known as somatic embryogenesis (SE), CFS researchers have been the first to use a single cell to regenerate larch trees. The same process has also been used to culture the eastern white pine and jack pine and may lead to the development of genetically modified conifers suited to special needs such as fibre production. The Service operates six research centres across Canada, including the Pacific Forestry Centre in Victoria, British Columbia, the Northern Forestry Centre in Edmonton, Alberta, the Great Lakes Forestry Centre in Sault Ste. Marie, Ontario, the Laurentien Forestry Centre in Quebec, City and the Atlantic Forestry Centre in Fredericton, New Brunswick, as well as two research forests: the Petawawa Research Forest and the Acadia Research Forest. Fields of research include biodiversity, biotechnology and bioproducts, climate change, ecology and ecosystems, entomology, pathology, silviculture and forest regeneration. The Canadian Wood Fibre Centre in Ottawa, another CFS facility, investigates industrial applications of wood fibre.

===== Medical research =====
The Canadian Institutes of Health Research, which replaced the Medical Research Council in 2000 and consist of a number of virtual institutes, fund medical research in a variety of fields including aboriginal peoples' health, aging, cancer, circulatory and respiratory health, gender and health, genetics, human development, infection, musculoskeletal health, diabetes, neuroscience, and public health. Research is conducted in cooperation with the pharmaceutical industry and medical schools across Canada.

There have been significant developments in stem cell research activity during this period. In 1997, John Dick, a molecular biologist at the University of Toronto, was the first to discover the existence of cancer stem cells. The Stem Cell Network was established in 2001 with headquarters at the University of Ottawa, and brings together more than 80 leading scientists, clinicians and engineers from Canadian universities and hospitals. Researchers study cellular therapeutics and their pharmacological applications as well as related technologies, public policy, ethical, legal and social issues with the goal of effectively treating cancer, heart and lung disease, macular degeneration, stroke, multiple sclerosis, spinal cord injury, Parkinson's disease, muscle degeneration, hemophilia and type 1 diabetes. It is hoped that research will lead to clinical applications for these afflictions by 2015. Stem cell research is also undertaken at the McEwen Centre for Regenerative Medicine established in 2003 in Toronto as part of the University Health Network in 2003. In 2010, the McMaster University Stem Cell and Cancer Research Institute announced that it had developed a technique for transforming skin cells into multiple blood cell types. This discovery may have applications for the treatment of leukemia, for it is anticipated that a patient with the disease may be able to receive therapeutic blood transfusions derived from his or her own skin cells, thus eliminating problems related to compatibility that are associated with treatment that involves biological material from others.

The University Health Network in Toronto is also home to a number of other medical research institutes, including the Ontario Cancer Institute, the Advanced Medical Discovery Institute, the Campbell Family Cancer Research Institute, the Campbell Family Institute for Breast Cancer Research, the Toronto General Research Institute, and the Toronto Western Research Institute.

The International Regulome Consortium is a Canadian-led international initiative, begun in 2004, the aim of which is to map the functional transcriptome or the genetic circuitry of stem cells. Planned as a follow-up to the Human Genome Project, the consortium is headquartered at the University of Ottawa and led by Michel Rudniki. In 2009, Andras Nagy, a biologist at Mount Sinai Hospital in Toronto, developed a practical way to transform mature human cells into the equivalent of embryonic stem cells, moving medicine one step closer to the use of these cells for the treatment of disease. Also in 2009, a team led by John Davies of the Institute of Biomaterials and Biomedical Engineering at the University of Toronto was the first in the world to isolate special stem cells, known as mesenchymal stem cells, and perform experiments showing that they could be used to regenerate specific types of human tissue. The cells themselves came from the umbilical cord tissue of newborn babies.

In 2008, the federal government also donated $100 million for research to the Cancer Stem Cell Consortium, a group of Canadian and US researchers, that includes Genome Canada, the Canadian Institutes for Health Research and the Canadian Foundation for Innovation, for a three-year project into the prevention and treatment of cancer.

Genomics and the closely related proteomics have become the leading fields for biological research in recent years. In 2000, the government of Canada created Genome Canada to conduct research in these fields. This organization is composed of six centres: Genome British Columbia in Vancouver, Genome Alberta in Calgary, Genome Prairie in Saskatoon and Winnipeg, the Ontario Genomics Institute in Toronto, Genome Quebec in Montreal, and Genome Atlantic in Halifax. These centres conduct genomic and proteomic research in such fields as human health, agriculture, forestry, the environment and the fisheries.

Proteomics research received a boost in 2008 when Canada's most powerful research computer an IBM supercomputer was installed in Toronto. The $20 million machine, about the size of an SUV, can make 12.5 trillion computations per second and will be used for proteomics research by the Ontario Cancer Institute, the Princess Margaret Hospital (specializing in cancer) and the University Health Network.

A new field, metabolomics, has generated much recent interest. The logical next step after genomics, which studies the plan for protein construction and proteomics, which studies the manufacture of the proteins themselves from that plan, metabolomics studies the metabolic molecules produced by those proteins in an organism. After receiving a $7.5 million grant from Genome Canada and Genome Alberta, the University of Alberta in Edmonton began the Human Metabolome Project in 2005 with the goal of identifying, quantifying and cataloguing all metabolites in human tissue and biofluids. By 2008, about 2500 metabolites of an estimated total of 2900 had been identified and catalogued. This information is of use in clinical chemistry, newborn screening, toxicology, pharmacology and transplant monitoring among other things.

Heart disease research has also grown throughout this period. One organization of note is the Canadian Heart Research Institute founded in 1996, as a not-for-profit academic research organization in Toronto, which specializes in the organization and conduct of clinical trials. In 2001, the Canadian Institutes of Health Research awarded $24.4 million for 61 projects related to cardiac research across Canada.

Cancer research in Canada was reinforced through the establishment of the privately funded Campbell Family Institute for Breast Cancer Research (The Campbell Family Institute), rated as one of the top five cancer research facilities in the world, at the Princess Margaret Hospital in Toronto in June 2004.

Research into spinal cord injury received a boost in 2008 with the establishment of the Blusson Spinal Cord Centre at the Vancouver General Hospital. The largest facility of its type in the world, it is home to more than 300 scientists and technicians working to find ways to repair spinal cord damage.

The Public Health Agency of Canada in Ottawa, Ontario is also a significant player in health research and has a number of facilities that conduct medical research, including the Centre for Chronic Disease Prevention and Control and the Centre for Infectious Disease Prevention and Control, both in Ottawa, and the Laboratory for Foodborne Zoonoses in Guelph, Ontario. Of particular note is the National Microbiology Laboratory (NML) in Winnipeg, Manitoba, with its level-4 biohazard containment and research facilities. In 2009, scientists at the NML were the first in the world to decode the genetic sequence for the H1N1 flu virus.

Founded in 2001 and affiliated with the University of Ottawa and the Ottawa Hospital, the Ottawa Health Research Institute has become one of Canada's most important medical research organizations. With more than 325 scientists, 300 students, 625 support staff and an annual budget of $54 million (2004–05), the institute conducts research related to a wide variety of ailments including, cancer, diabetes, heart disease, kidney disease and muscular dystrophy.

With a staff of more than 600, the Robarts Research Institute was established in 1986 at the University of Western Ontario as a non-profit medical research centre. The Institute's activities target a variety of serious medical conditions including, heart disease and stroke, diabetes, Alzheimer's and cancer. Research at the Institute led to the recommendation that the risk of stroke can be reduced by taking a daily dose of aspirin.

The importance of transferring scientific discovery to the business sector has continued to grow in recent years, and a number of 2007 medical "Centres of Excellence for Commercialization and Research (CECR)", with significant corporate funding, have been established to facilitate this task. MaRS (MaRS Discovery District), the largest in the field, located in Toronto, consists of researchers at the University of Toronto, the major hospitals in the city and two dozen other research organizations. Others medical CECRs include the Pan-Provincial Vaccine Enterprise, (Saskatoon), the Centre of Excellence in Personalized Medicine (Montreal), the Institute for Research in Immunology and Cancer (Montreal), the Centre for Drug Research and Development, (Vancouver), the Centre for the Prevention of Epidemic Organ Failure (Vancouver), the Prostate Centre Transnational Research Initiative for Accelerated Discovery and Development (Vancouver) and the Centre for Probe Development and Commercialization (Hamilton).

After a number of complex corporate changes over a period of 30 years, Connaught Laboratories emerged in 2004 as Sanofi Pasteur with modern facilities focusing on vaccine research, in Toronto. Ongoing projects include the $350 million 10-year Cancer Vaccine Programme with possible treatments for melanoma, colorectal cancer and breast cancer as well as investigations into vaccines for HIV, pneumococcal infection and respiratory syncytial virus (RSV).

Extensive medical research programmes are also undertaken by a number of other private companies including: Pfizer Canada Inc., GlaxoSmithKline Inc., Merck Frosst Canada Ltd. (Merck & Co), Biovail Corporation, AstraZeneca Canada Inc., QLT Inc., MDS Inc., Vasogen Inc., Novartis Pharmaceuticals Canada Inc., Wyeth Pharmaceuticals and Neurochem Inc.

In 2008, the Biovail Corporation announced plans to invest $600 million over a five-year period to develop drugs for the treatment of neurological conditions such as epilepsy, multiple sclerosis and Parkinson's disease.

Canadian Blood Services, a not-for-profit organization founded in 1998 after a reorganization of the Canadian Red Cross, manages the supply of Canada's medical blood and blood products and ensures the highest standards for Canadian transfusion medical research and development.

International cooperation in medical research has become important technique in dealing with the understanding of severe diseases such as cancer. Starting in 2008, Canada, through the Ontario Institute for Cancer Research in Toronto, will lead the International Cancer Genome Consortium, a research project involving nine other countries, that will hunt for the genetic mutations that are the basis for 50 types of cancer. The Canadian contribution includes the investigation of the genetic basis for pancreatic cancer as well and the computer storage and manipulation of the data for the project.

The Multiple Sclerosis Society of Canada announced in 2009 the establishment of a network of five research centres, one each in the five regions of Canada. The centres, each with links to regional teaching hospitals and universities, will search for a cure for that disease.

The Canadian Foundation for AIDS Research, established in Toronto in 1987, conducts studies related to finding a cure for this disease.

A unique development relating mostly to the field of medical and biological research is the creation by the City of Toronto of the Discovery District, in recognition of the high geographical concentration of research facilities in these fields, in the area bounded by Bloor Street in the north, Bay Street in the east, Dundas Street in the south and Spadina Avenue in the west. The 2.5 kilometer square district is home to one of the largest concentrations of research institutions in the world, including Donnelly Centre for Cellular and Bio-Molecular Research, the new Leslie Dan Faculty of Pharmacy, MaRS, the Ontario Institute for Cancer Research, the Samuel Lunenfeld Research Institute of Mount Sinai Hospital, St. Michael's Hospital, Sunnybrook Research Institute, SickKids – The Hospital for Sick Children Research Institute, University Health Network (UHN) Research, the Centre for Addiction and Mental Health, the University of Toronto, the Faculty of Nursing, University of Toronto, Women's College Hospital, Toronto Metropolitan University and York University.

===== Cognitive science =====
Certain types of problems and phenomena are so complex that they are not easily studied or understood through the lens of one scientific discipline. A combination of disciplines or multidisciplinary approach is more helpful in such cases. Cognitive science, which attempts to explain the nature the human mind, including consciousness, cognition and intelligence, arguably the most intractable phenomena in science, has inspired a number of such multidisciplinary research efforts.

The Institute for Cognitive Science, the first of its type in Canada, established in 2006 at Carleton University in Ottawa, draws on the fields of psychology, philosophy, linguistics and computer science to conduct research into cognition. Other universities, including U of T, McGill, University of Calgary, UBC (the Institute for Computing, Information, and Cognitive Systems), Queen's and York use a similar interdisciplinary approach to study cognition.

Artificial intelligence has become an important field of study, and the computer science departments of all G-13 universities conduct research in this field. The Artificial Intelligence Research Group at the University of Waterloo investigates machine learning and reasoning under uncertainty, robotics, multi-agent systems, natural language understanding, computational vision and models of intelligent interaction. The University of Toronto is active in the fields of computational linguistics and natural language processing, knowledge representation and cognitive robotics, computational vision, and machine learning and neural networks. Of note is the research of Geoffrey Hinton regarding Boltzmann machines. Using the research of Hinton, Yoshua Bengio of the University of Montreal and others are attempting to create a mathematical model of consciousness.

The private sector is also involved in AI research. The Canadian Society for Computational Studies of Intelligence, established in 1987 and renamed the Canadian Artificial Intelligence Association in 2008, represents commercial businesses, including Acquired Intelligence Inc. of Victoria, B.C., AND Corporation and OAK Systems Development Corporation, both of Toronto and Applied AI Systems Inc. of Ottawa, which also approach the concept of intelligence from a computational perspective.

Since the 1980s, researcher Michael Persinger, at Laurentien University in Sudbury, Ontario, has conducted controversial experiments into the electromagnetic stimulation of an individual's temporal lobes. He claims that such stimulation induces a "religious" experience.

NeuroScience Canada, founded in 1990, funds multidisciplinary neurological research for the study of neurological disorders such as chronic pain, cognitive impairment and neurotrauma. In 2008, Bruce McNaughton was the first to receive the $20 million Alberta Heritage Foundation for Medical Research, Polaris Award. He will undertake studies in the field of computational neuroscience at the Canadian Centre for Behavioural Neuroscience at the University of Lethbridge.

All G-13 universities have departments of philosophy with doctorate level staff members conducting research related to the philosophy of the mind. The work of Paul R. Thagard at the University of Waterloo, with respect to cognitive functions and coherence, is of note. Charles Taylor of McGill University in Montreal has studied consciousness within the context of European Hegelianism. Zenon Pylyshyn, a psychologist and computer scientist at the University of Western Ontario from 1964 to 1994, has made significant contributions to cognitive science. Other Canadian-born and educated cognitive scientists have made their mark in the US including David Kirsh, John Robert Anderson, Keith Holyoak and Steven Pinker.

Founded in 1991 at the University of British Columbia in Vancouver, the Peter Wall Institute for Advanced Studies represents a novel approach to research in Canada. Modelled after the Institute for Advanced Study in Princeton in the US, the Institute uses the multidisciplinary technique to conduct research related to problems in the fields of science, social science and the humanities. The current director, Dianne Newell, is a professor of history.

==== Big science (1985–present) ====
Major post-war science facilities were closed down during this period, notably the Algonquin Park Radio Observatory and the tokamak reactor. In spite of cutbacks, a number of big new science projects were realized, including the Canadian Astronaut Programme, the Sudbury Neutrino Observatory in Sudbury, Ontario, the National Microbiological Laboratory in Winnipeg, the Canadian Light Source Synchrotron at the University of Saskatoon in Saskatoon, Saskatchewan and the National Institute for Nanotechnology in Edmonton, Alberta.

At the beginning of the 21st century, due to financial restraints, token funding efforts were made to give Canada a place with the construction and operation of the Gemini astronomical telescopes and the Large Hadron Collider in Geneva. Canada's participation in the international fusion reactor project was cancelled. Funding restraints also disrupted the supply of medical isotopes produced at Chalk River in 2007, and Canadian astronaut and former head of the Canadian Space Agency Marc Garneau called for the creation of a national space policy to revive Canada's flagging space programme.

==== Nobel Laureates and other scientists of note (1985–present) ====
A number of Nobel prizes were awarded to Canadian scientists during this time of restraint, including John C. Polanyi (Chemistry, 1986), Sidney Altman (Chemistry, 1989), Richard E. Taylor (Physics, 1990), Rudolph Marcus (Chemistry, 1992), Michael Smith (Chemistry, 1993), Bertram N. Brockhouse (Physics, 1994), William Vickrey (Economic Sciences, 1996), Myron Scholes (Economics, 1997), Robert Mundell (Economics, 1999), Willard Boyle (Physics, 2009), and Ralph M. Steinman (Physiology or Medicine, 2011).

Other scientists of note include Lee Smolin of the Perimeter Institute and Stuart Kauffman at the University of Calgary's Institute for Biocomplexity and Informatics.

==== Canadian scientific research (2000s) ====
In recent years, the Association of Universities and Colleges of Canada has published two reports (one in 2005 and an update in 2008) entitled "Momentum" on the state of Canadian university research.

In 2007, university research accounted for about 40% of all research spending in Canada, while scientific research in government laboratories accounted for about 10%. That same year, C$10.4 billion was invested in university research and it is estimated that this research contributed about C$60 billion to the Canadian economy.

Canada's performance in the field of science is mixed. For example, with respect to scientific publications, Canada ranked sixth in the world in the absolute number of scientific papers published and their frequency of citation in 2008. On the other hand, with respect to basic infrastructure such as computing power, Canada was home to only two out of 500 of the world's supercomputers in 2007. Furthermore, the government of Canada has not funded the construction of a new observatory since 1978.

Spending on scientific research and development in the 2009 federal budget sent mixed signals. On one hand, total spending amounted to more than $10 billion in the 2009–2010 fiscal year, about the same as the previous year, and there was an announcement of spending on new research infrastructure and the renovation of existing infrastructure. This included $2 billion to repair and upgrade universities, $750 million for modernization of research infrastructure through the Canada Foundation for Innovation, $500 million to Canada Health Infoway, $250 million for maintenance of federal laboratories, $225 million to provide broadband Internet coverage to rural communities, $87 million to upgrade arctic research facilities and $50 million for the Institute for Quantum Computing at the University of Waterloo.

On the other hand, there were spending cuts to the scientific research granting agencies, including $147.9 million from the Canadian Institutes of Health Research, the Natural Sciences and Engineering Research Council of Canada and the Social Sciences and Humanities Research Council of Canada. Furthermore, $27.7 million was cut from the National Research Council of Canada.

==== Canadian scientific research (2010s) ====
Trends in Canadian science policy, investments and production are examined in the UNESCO Science Report series, produced every five years. The 2021 edition examines Canada's pathway to the Sustainable Development Goals and the Fourth Industrial Revolution.

Canada's gross domestic expenditure on research and development amounted to Can$35.7 billion in 2017; this represents a 2% increase over the previous year. The increase was mainly tied to a 3.8% rise (to Can$14.3 billion) in research expenditure for the higher education sector, the eighth hike in as many years. This underscores the role that the Canadian higher education sector plays as a prime driver of innovation – even as a surrogate for industrial research and development (R&D) – particularly in comparison to other members of the Organisation for Economic Co-operation and Development (OECD).

The boost in 2017 spending was not enough to reverse a decline in the share of gross domestic product invested in research, which sank from 1.8% over 2010 to 2012 to a low of 1.5% in 2019.

The decline in industrial research spending is of particular concern. Expenditure on industrial R&D as a share of GDP amounts to only half the OECD average. Foreign-controlled firms account for one-third of all in-house research and development, a persistent trend over recent decades. In 2017, the government allocated Can$950 million over a five-year period to support innovative 'superclusters' to spur public–private collaboration on the ocean economy, next-generation manufacturing, digital technology, protein industries and artificial intelligence. In so doing, the government is challenging Canadian enterprises to enter into collaborative partnerships with research institutions, in order to develop ‘bold and ambitious’ innovation strategies. The government expects the initiative to result in the creation of 50 000 jobs over ten years.

Canada's key cachet remains its openness and global connections as a G7 and G20 partner with an international outlook. Canada ranked tenth in the world in terms of total scientific output in 2018, and Canadian researchers produced 56% of their publications with foreign co-authors over 2017 to 2019, higher than the OECD average of 34%.

The nascent Canada Research Coordinating Committee aims to improve co-ordination at federal level, including through the New Frontiers in Research Fund designed to bolster federal support for high-risk, game-changing research.

The government's support for evidence-based decision-making is reflected in the appointment of a Chief Science Advisor in 2017, almost ten years after the position was abolished.

The Inuit Tapiriit Kanatami, a body representing the 65 000 Inuit residing in Canada, published its National Inuit Strategy on Research in March 2018. This strategy redirected attention to the issue of integrating community-based knowledge into Canada’s knowledge ecosystem. Among other recommendations, the implementation plan calls for an Inuit Nunangat Deputy Chief Science Advisor to help oversee the development of an Inuit Nunangat research policy.

The Pan-Canadian Artificial Intelligence Strategy (2017) commits funds to raising the number of outstanding AI researchers and skilled graduates. Canada is striving to assume a leadership role in the international conversation on the potential social impact of AI.

== See also ==
- Science and technology in Canada
- Canadian government scientific research organizations
- Canadian university scientific research organizations
- Canadian industrial research and development organizations
- Canadian scientists
- Canadian inventions
- Canadian space program
- Nuclear power in Canada
- Group of Thirteen
- Canada Research Chair
- List of botanical gardens in Canada
- List of CAZA member zoos and aquariums
- Philosophy in Canada
- Economic history of Canada

== Sources ==
- This article incorporates text from a free content work. Licensed under C-BY-SA 3.0 IGO. Text taken from UNESCO Science Report: the Race Against Time for Smarter Development., Schneegans, S., T. Straza and J. Lewis (eds), UNESCO.
