= Planet Simulator =

Machine designed to study life in the universe

The Planet Simulator, also known as the Planetary Simulator, is a climate-controlled simulation chamber designed to aid in the study of the origin of life. The device was announced by researchers at McMaster University on behalf of the Origins Institute on 4 October 2018. The project began in 2012 and was funded with $1 million from the Canada Foundation for Innovation, the Ontario government, and McMaster University. It was built and manufactured by Angstrom Engineering Inc of Kitchener, Ontario.

The device was designed and developed by biophysicist Maikel Rheinstadter and co-principal investigators biochemist Yingfu Li and astrophysicist Ralph Pudritz for researchers to study a theory that suggests life on early Earth began in "warm little ponds" rather than in deep ocean vents nearly four billion years ago. The device is able to recreate conditions of the primitive Earth to see whether cellular life can be created, and then later, evolve.

The Planet Simulator has the ability to mimic the environmental conditions consistent on the early Earth and other astronomical bodies, including other planets and exoplanets by controlling temperature, humidity, pressure, atmosphere and radiation levels within the simulation chamber.

In 2021, Lynn J. Rothschild visited McMaster to collaborate with the Origins of Life Laboratory and use the Planet Simulator to conduct research on whether mycelium could be grown as structural habitat material on the moon or Mars.
