= Canadian Bioinformatics Workshops =

Series of bioinformatics training workshops

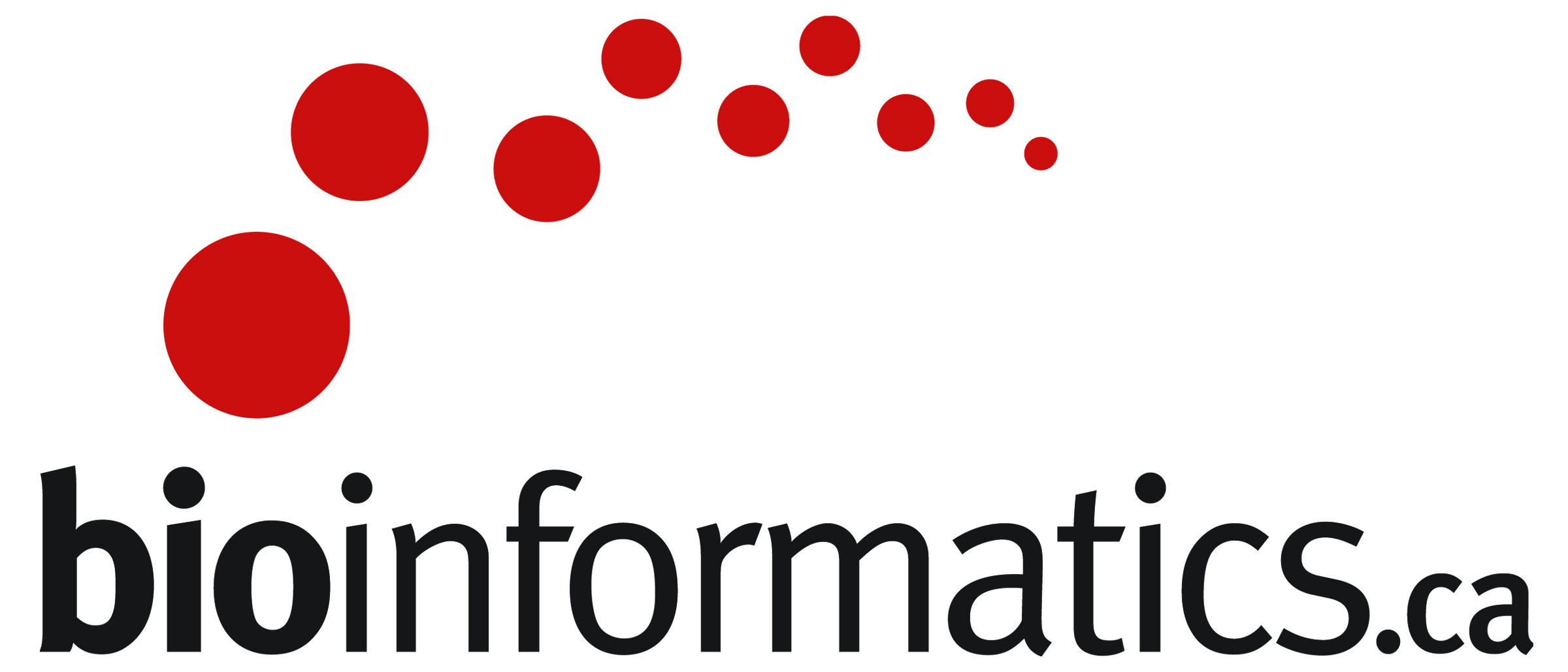
- Formation: 1999
- Type: Non-profit training program
- Purpose: Bioinformatics training and education
- Location: Canada
- Key people: Michelle Brazas (Scientific Director), Francis Ouellette (Founder)
- Website: Official website

Canadian Bioinformatics Workshops (CBW) are a series of advanced training workshops in bioinformatics offered across Canada since 1999. The program was established in response to a growing need for bioinformatics expertise in the Canadian life sciences sector, identified in policy and workforce reports on biotechnology and computational biology in Canada. The workshops provide intensive short courses combining lectures with hands-on computational training using biological datasets and have trained researchers and students across Canada.

== Founding and early workshops in British Columbia (1999–2007) ==
The Canadian Bioinformatics Workshops series began offering one- and two-week short courses in bioinformatics, genomics and proteomics in 1999, in response to an identified need for a skilled bioinformatics workforce in Canada. In partnership with the Canadian Genetics Diseases Network and Human Resources Development Canada, and under the scientific direction of Director, Francis Ouellette, the CBW series was established.

For eight years, the series offered short courses in bioinformatics, genomics and proteomics in various cities across Canada. The courses were taught by top faculty from Canada and the US, and offered small classes and hands-on instruction.

== Expansion at the Ontario Institute for Cancer Research (2007–2018) ==
In 2007, the Canadian Bioinformatics Workshops moved to Toronto and were hosted by the Ontario Institute for Cancer Research (OICR). The program was led by Francis Ouellette with Michelle Brazas serving as project manager. During this period the workshops were redesigned to emphasize short, intensive courses combining lectures with hands-on computational exercises using real biological datasets. The Canadian Bioinformatics Workshops began offering two-day advanced topic workshops in 2008.

== Workshops hosted at McGill University (2018–2021) ==
In 2018, the series was hosted by McGill University with support from the Ontario Institute for Cancer Research. As a result of the global pandemic, the format of workshops changed to virtual in 2020. In 2021, Francis Ouellette stepped down from scientific leadership of Bioinformatics.ca and CBW.

== Return to Ontario and national expansion (2021–present) ==
With funding support from the Canadian Institutes of Health Research, Genome Canada and Ontario Genomics, Bioinformatics.ca moved back to the Ontario Institute for Cancer Research under the leadership of Dr. Michelle Brazas (CBW Program Manager from 2007-2015) and underwent a reimagining exercise to scale the workshops across the country.

All workshop material is licensed under a Creative Commons-Share Alike 4.0 license and is available on the CBW Git site.

The CBW is sponsored by the Canadian Institutes of Health Research and the Ontario Institute for Cancer Research.
