= Cooperative Human Tissue Network =

The Cooperative Human Tissue Network (the CHTN) was established in 1987 by the National Cancer Institute in response to an increase in the demand for high quality biospecimens for cancer research. The purpose of the CHTN is to stimulate, for the good of the public, cooperative efforts to collect and distribute human biospecimens and to thereby facilitate research utilizing those specimens. These activities are expected to encourage basic and developmental studies in many areas of cancer research, including molecular biology, immunology and genetics. The CHTN is not intended to be a human tissue bank, but instead procures tissue at the request of an investigator. Limited banking was to be done as needed to meet specific requests and longer-term banking of targeted specimens to assure availability of rare and hard to obtain materials. It is funded under a UM1 NIH grant.

== Divisions ==
The CHTN has six divisions, five adult divisions and one pediatric division. These divisions are located at the following institutions:

- University of Pennsylvania - CHTN Eastern Division
- University of Virginia - CHTN Mid-Atlantic Division
- Ohio State University - CHTN Midwestern Division
- Duke University - CHTN Southern Division
- Vanderbilt University Medical Center - CHTN Western Division
- Nationwide Children's Hospital - CHTN Pediatric Division

== History ==
The CHTN was established in 1987 as the Cooperative Human Tissue Network by the National Cancer Institute's Cancer Diagnosis Program. The University of Alabama at Birmingham, National Disease Research Interchange in conjunction with the hospital of the University of Pennsylvania, and The Ohio State University with a subcontract to Nationwide Children's Hospital were awarded the first Cooperative Human Tissue Network grant by the NCI. A second grant was funded during 1991-1995, and Case Western Reserve University (CWRU) joined the CHTN and Nationwide Children’s Hospital became an independent group. A third round of funding provided for 1996-2001, and the funding was transferred from NDRI to the University of Pennsylvania. The grant was renewed a fourth time for 2001-2006, in which the University of Virginia was added and Vanderbilt University Medical Center replaced Case Western Reserve University. A fifth grant was given for 2008 through 2013, and the sixth for 2014-2019, with supplemental funding bridging the years in between grants. The grant was renewed a seventh time for 2019-2024, in which Duke University replaced The University of Alabama Birmingham. The name was changed in 2014 to the Collaborative Human Tissue Network.

== CHTN biospecimens ==
The CHTN obtains biospecimens from routine diagnostic or therapeutic surgical resections and autopsies, which otherwise would be discarded. Malignant, benign, diseased, and normal biospecimens are collected and distributed to both national and international investigators. In addition, remnant body fluids are available on some patients and limited histological services can be obtained by special arrangement. Requests for large sample sizes, large numbers of biospecimens, rare biospecimens, or biospecimens in high demand may be served if they do not negatively impact the availability of biospecimens for other researchers.

Investigators must complete a standard CHTN application which includes a brief description of their research project, funding information, and biospecimen requirements. In addition, researchers must submit documentation of his/her Institutional Review Board (IRB) approval or exemption.

The intent of the CHTN is to encourage research using human biospecimens for the good of the public rather than for private gain. The CHTN Agreement for Use of Tissue, which must be signed by all CHTN investigators, states “The recipient agrees that it shall not sell any portion of the tissues provided by the CHTN, or products directly extracted from these tissues (e.g. protein, mRNA or DNA). The recipient agrees that it shall not transfer tissue (or any portion thereof) supplied by the CHTN to third parties without the prior written permission of the CHTN.”

== Policies and procedures for the protection of human subjects ==
The CHTN has established operating policies and procedures that protect the subjects from whom CHTN biospecimens are obtained. These policies and procedures are consistent with current regulations and guidance for repositories from the Office of Human Research Protections (OHRP) in the Department of Human and Health Services (DHHS). The following policies and procedures govern the collection of biospecimens and their distribution to researchers:

- CHTN biospecimens are derived from material that is removed as part of routine medical care or collected as autopsy biospecimens; all biospecimens are collected in accordance with state and local laws. Only residual material not needed for patient care is distributed for research.
- Every CHTN institution has obtained a human subjects Assurance from the OHRP of the DHHS. The Assurance documents are an agreement stating that the institution will comply with Federal human subject’s regulations (The "Common Rule;" 45CFR46).
- Each division of the CHTN has received approval for the collection and distribution of specimens from its local Institutional Review Board (IRB). The IRBs review the procedures in place to ensure adequate protection of human subjects and protection of patient privacy and confidentiality. The approvals are reviewed by the IRB every year.
- Donor identities or other identifying information is never provided to researchers. Each biospecimen is assigned a unique code and every CHTN employee has signed an agreement to protect patient privacy and confidentiality. Also, each employee is trained in human subjects, IRB, and HIPAA issues/regulations.
- Each researcher must document review and approval by his/her IRB of the specific research proposed or submit a signed agreement form stipulating the terms and conditions for the use of the specimens. The researcher and his or her institutional official must also sign an agreement form indicating that they will use biospecimens only for the purposes specified in the application, that they agree not to attempt to obtain information identifying the individuals providing biospecimens to the CHTN, and that they will not share the biospecimens with third parties. This approach is consistent with current OHRP guidance for tissue repositories. Investigators at institutions that DO NOT have an IRB may instead submit a fully executed copy of the CHTN Human Subjects Agreement with their application. This form is NOT intended to be utilized by investigators who do have access to a local IRB or use an external accredited IRB.

== See also ==
- Tumor Bank
