= NDRI =

NDRI may refer to:

- Norepinephrine-dopamine reuptake inhibitor
- National Dairy Research Institute, India
- National Development and Research Institute, United States, researched various public health and social matters
- National Disease Research Interchange, United States, distributes human tissues etc. for scientific research
