= Michelle Brazas =

Computational biologist

Michelle D. Brazas
- Education: University of British Columbia
- Awards: ISCB Fellow (2026)
- Scientific career
- Institutions: British Columbia Institute of Technology; Ontario Institute for Cancer Research
- Thesis: Responses of Pseudomonas aeruginosa to sub-inhibitory antibiotics (2005)
- Doctoral advisors: Robert E. W. Hancock

Michelle Denise Brazas is a computational biologist and director of adaptive oncology at the Ontario Institute for Cancer Research.

== Education ==
Brazas gained her PhD in microbiology from the University of British Columbia in 2005, under the direction of Robert E. W. Hancock. Her thesis was on the responses of the bacterium Pseudomonas aeruginosa to sub-inhibitory antibiotics.

== Career and research ==
Brazas held a research faculty position at the British Columbia Institute of Technology, before moving to Toronto. She joined the Ontario Institute for Cancer Research in 2007 as a manager of research and knowledge exchange, becoming director of adaptive oncology in 2024. Since 2021, she has also been scientific Director of Bioinformatics.ca, a national bioinformatics training and community building program. She has served as secretary, executive committee member and chair of the nominations committee in the International Society for Computational Biology (ISCB).

== Awards and honours ==
In 2026, Brazas was named by the ISCB as an ISCB Fellow.
