= National Institute for Nanotechnology =

Canadian research institution

Coordinates: 53.528391°N 113.528283°W

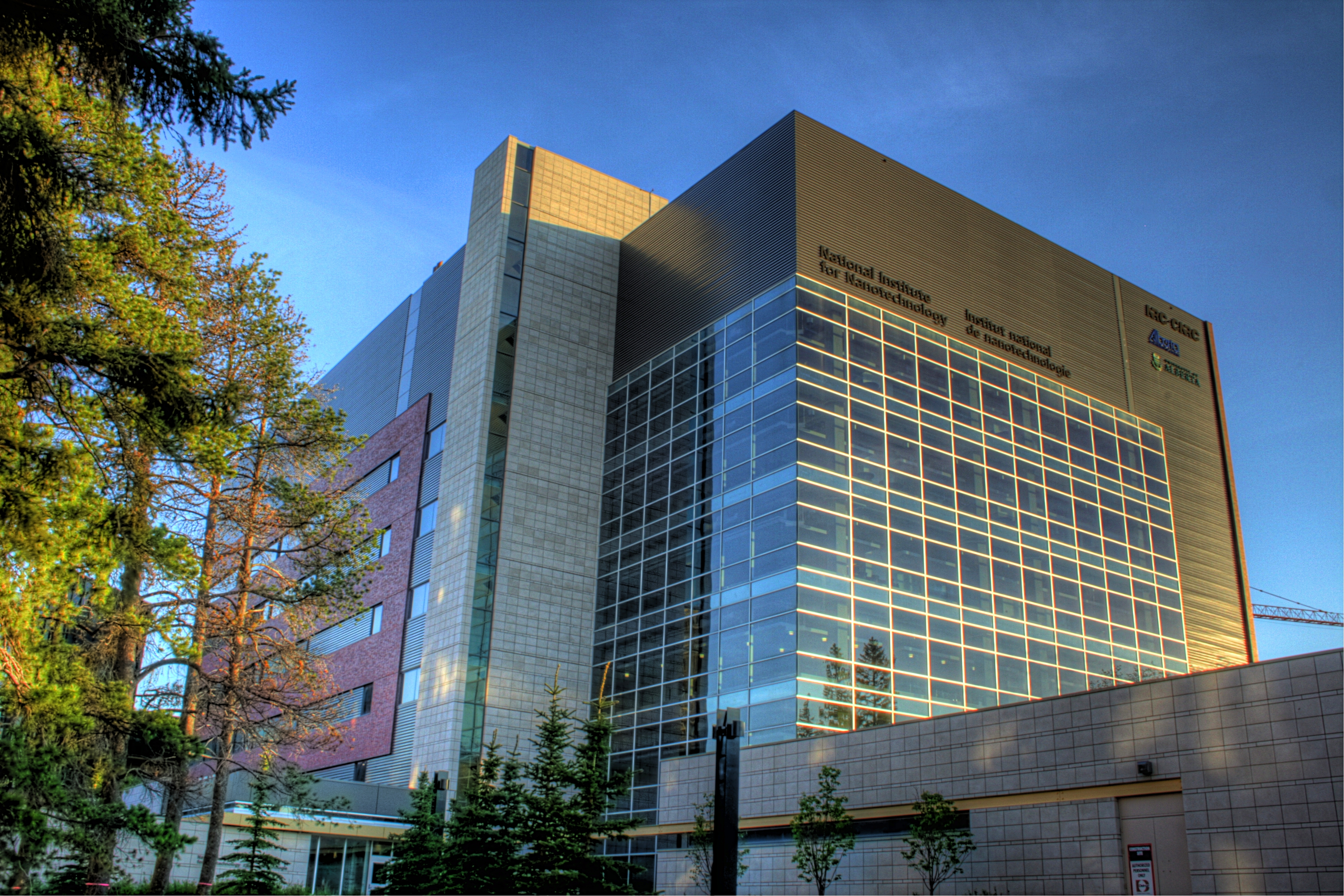
Nanotechnology Research Centre, Edmonton Alberta

The National Research Council of Canada Nanotechnology Research Centre (formerly National Institute for Nanotechnology) is a research institution located on the University of Alberta main campus, in Edmonton, Alberta, Canada. Its primary purpose is nanoscience research.

The institute was established in 2001 as a partnership between the National Research Council of Canada, the University of Alberta, and the Government of Alberta. It is administered as an institute of the National Research Council of Canada (NRC), and governed by a board of trustees nominated by the partners. Its core funding comes from the Government of Canada and additional funding and research support comes from the university, Government of Alberta, and various federal and provincial funding agencies.

In June 2006, the institute moved into its present 20,000 m^{2} (220,000 sq ft) facility, designed to be one of the world's largest buildings for nanotechnological research. There are at most two or three other facilities worldwide matching the new building in scale and capacity.

In 2017, the institute became the Nanotechnology Research Centre, following a recognition of the institute as its own research centre. Although on the premises of the University of Alberta, the research centre is a branch of the National Research Council of Canada.

== Research areas ==
The Nanotechnology Research Centre plans to focus on the following areas of research:

NanoBiology

- Antimicrobials
- Drug delivery
- Gene delivery
- Immunity
- Biomaterials
- Scaffolds

NanoElectronics

- Electrochem
- Microfluidics
- Nano & Micro Fabrication
- Optical NEMS
- Photonics
- Quantum

Next-generation Microscopy

- Advanced characterization
- Instrument development
- Integration & optimization
- Microscopy-enabled manufacturing

== Achievements ==
A new approach to nanosensors, revolutionizing the concept, was published in Science magazine in 2018.

The sharpest man-made object, a tungsten needle created by Mohamed Rezeq, was created at NINT in 2006.

== See also ==
- Natural scientific research in Canada
- Technological and industrial history of Canada
- Canadian government scientific research organizations
- Canadian university scientific research organizations
- Canadian industrial research and development organizations
