= Tumor Bank =

A tumor bank is sometimes also referred to as a Tissue Bank, since normal tissues for research are also often collected. However, this function is distinct from a Tissue Bank which collects and harvests human cadaver tissue for medical research and education, and banks which store Biomedical tissue for organ transplantation.

== Cancer Samples ==
Most tumor banks collect their tumor samples from discarded tissues not needed for pathologic diagnosis, after patients undergo surgery to remove the tumor. The method of sample preservation is critical, and must be compatible with the downstream analysis techniques. Tissue is often snap frozen in liquid nitrogen but may also be preserved in special fixative such as RNAlater (which preserves RNA and proteins), or formalin which preserves tissue architecture. Proteins and RNA can readily be extracted and characterized from tissue preserved with either method.

Many Cancer Centers in the U.S. have a Tumor Bank to supply biomedical scientists with actual patient samples of cancer and associated adjacent normal tissue. This process is currently a high priority to support more Translational Research.

All institutional banks preserve tissue that may be used in research not necessarily related to the patient. Depending on the nationality and regulatory environment of the clinic, re-purposing of excised tissues and samples collected during the course of standard care for use in research may or may not require the consent of the patient. In some countries the patient loses control over their tissue immediately after the surgery or after some specified period of time, after which the material is classed as medical waste. In the US, samples may be collected and used with the patient's consent, or after some period of time defined by the clinic's Institutional Review Board samples may be considered exempt from consent under US 45CFR46, which governs the use of human subjects in research. Many academic and institutional biobanks will not release samples to commercial or big pharma research labs, and some will not even release samples to other academic institutions, so there is a chronic shortage of oncology samples available for research. Additionally, sample availability is governed primarily by clinical standard care, and the trend towards starting chemical treatments immediately upon diagnosis is making it especially difficult to obtain pre-treatment surgically excised tumor samples and pre-treatment blood draws for some cancer indications.

In addition to the general practices of tumor banks, the Ontario Tumor Bank (OTB), operated by the Ontario Institute for Cancer Research, exemplifies a significant scale and scope in biobanking. The OTB has amassed a collection exceeding 100,000 specimens from over 20,000 patients, making it one of the largest of its kind in Canada. This extensive repository supports a wide range of cancer research studies, from molecular and genetic analysis to clinical trials. The ability to access such a large and diverse collection of samples has been instrumental in advancing our understanding of cancer and improving therapeutic strategies. This large-scale collection underscores the critical role that well-maintained and ethically governed tumor banks play in the advancement of translational cancer research.

Personalized medicine may influence clinical policies related to biobanking as treatments may increasingly use the genetic characteristics of each individual's own cancer to select or develop uniquely targeted therapies. If personal biobanking options are not available to patients in some locations, they may conceivably start looking for private tumor banks to preserve their own excised tumors for use in their own future therapies. The implications of this trend for ethical and regulatory issues related to existing institutional biobanking policies are not yet clear.

Anti-cancer vaccines of the first type (from the patient's own tumour cells) are much easier to make, which is why many patients start treatment with them. In order for specialists to be able to create such a vaccine, whether when a tumour is first diagnosed or 3-5-10 years later when relapse occurs, it is advisable to freeze some of the tumour cells. At any time, the cell culture is thawed and specially processed, after which it is used to create a personalised product. In metastatic cancer patients are often recommended a combination therapy with oncolytic viruses and drugs based on the patient's own tissue, which also requires material from the cell bank. With this treatment it is possible to simultaneously activate the immune response (by acting on T-suppressors, checkpoint inhibitors) and enhance the anti-tumour effect of the immune system, by changing the function of the T-killer.

This provides an opportunity to develop digital design to create diagnostics, create miniature organ-on-a-chip devices and, most importantly, create human 'digital twins' technology for personalised cancer therapy.

== See also ==
- Cooperative Human Tissue Network (CHTN)
