= University of Waterloo Nano Robotics Group =

University of Waterloo Nanorobotics Group (UWNRG) is an undergraduate group composed of students from several different engineering programs, including Nanotechnology, Mechatronics, Electrical, Computer, and Software Engineering, various Math and Arts programs at the University of Waterloo. Their primary goal is the design of microrobots, as well as the promotion of nanotechnology and their program. The group was founded in 2007, and their most recent accomplishment was winning the Microassembly Challenge at the 2013 IEEE International Conference on Robotics and Automation (ICRA). They were the only completely undergraduate team, as well as the only Canadian team competing. UWNRG has since evolved from the robotics competition and now look into developing micro-robotics for different industry applications.

== Previous robots ==
=== MAYA ===
MAYA (Micro-Assembly YBCO Apparatus) is an experimental robot that utilizes the concept of quantum locking. By using this concept, the YBCO, a high temperature superconductor, can pic a micro-magnet in space above itself. From there, the position of the YBCO can be controlled using motors and actuators, which results in the movement of the micro-magnet. MAYA comes complete with an optical tracking system that can account for the error between the macro and micro-scale movements, resulting in high-precision actuation. More information can be found on the UWNRG website.

=== MICHELLE ===
MICHELLE (Mercury in a Clear Habitat Enclosure Leveraging Lorentz Excitation) uses microfluidics to accurately move the robot through another fluidic medium.

=== SAM ===
SAM (Solenoid Actuated Microrobot) is the spiritual successor to the EMMA robot, utilizing the displacement of a magnetic field.

=== SAW ===
Utilizing acoustic waves as propulsion for a MEMS device, UWNRG's surface acoustic wave team (known as SAW) is attempting to diversify the group's arsenal of microrobotic achievements. The design for SAW was initially conceived following our success in the 2011 NIST Mobile Microrobotics Challenge, and features the group's first entirely fluid reverse-piezoelectric microrobot design. The design consists of a nanolitre fluid droplet, moving atop a silanized glass substrate that has been patterned into an interdigital transducer (IDT). A lithium niobate wafer layered with titanium and gold thin films will be act as a surface acoustic wave generator, which will produce oscillations on the wafer surface. This will yield an excited fluid droplet, and ultimately result in linear propulsion of the fluid microrobot.

=== EMMA ===
EMMA (ElectroMagnetic Micro Actuation) is their best known project. It placed 3rd overall in the 2010 NIST Mobile Microrobotics Challenge in Alaska, and first place in the 2011 competition in Shanghai, China. EMMA is made of a magnetic alloy which moves by displacing the magnetic field surrounding the robot (magnetic actuation). The team is currently working on a research paper, "Characterizing the surface tension around the robot at a micro scale," and upgrading the design to have rotation along its axis. EMMA has several iterations, iteration 1 and iteration 1.5 having been completed. It is hoped that iteration 2.0 will be an improvement over current designs.

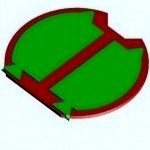
Image of the Microrobot PAMELA.

=== PAMELA ===
PAMELA (Pump Actuation Mediated by Excited Light Absorption) is a microfluidic based MEMS which was first developed by the NanoRobotics Group. Originally proposed in 2007 by the founding members of the group, its design is to use thrust to manipulate the microrobot through a fluidic medium. The propulsion system of the robot is two small pumps made of a photosensitive membrane that will deform and expel fluid when a laser is shone on the membrane. The motion of the robot is determined by focusing the laser beam onto an individual pump to turn, or on both pumps simultaneously for forward motion. PAMELA is hoped to be an improvement on EMMA because it will have the ability to turn left or right which the current iteration of EMMA currently lacks.

=== MICROCOPTER ===
MICROCOPTER is being developed with a copter-based propulsion system. The robot uses a rotor-shaped magnetic dipole placed in a rapidly revolving magnetic field. The rotor will constantly align itself with this magnetic field therefore mimicking a helicopter if the magnetic field can be moved quickly enough.

== Past events ==
=== Waterloo Nanotechnology Conference (WNC) ===
UWNRG participated in WNC's poster session in both 2018 and 2019, where they presented their research and current experimental projects.

=== The Nanotech Expo ===
UWNRG was a participant in the Nanotech Expo 2009 Tokyo, Japan in 2009, where the group traveled to Japan to represent the Canadian delegation, along with government officials and private organizations. The group was the only undergraduate organization at this international event. With the help of the groups mentors (professors and graduate fellows), the group presented its nanoscale pneumatic pump technology to an audience of Japanese government and industry representatives at the Canadian Embassy in Tokyo.

=== NIST Mobile Microrobotics Challenge ===
The University of Waterloo's Nanorobotics group has competed in the Microrobotics challenge hosted by the National Institute of Standards and Technology (NIST) for the past four years. During the 2013 Mobile Microrobotics Challenge at the International Conference on Robotics and Automation (ICRA) in Karlsruhe, Germany, UWNRG won first place in the Autonomous Mobility Challenge with the microrobot EMMA. At the ICRA 2011 in Shanghai, China, UWNRG placed first in the Mobile Microrobotics Challenge, beating over 10 other registered teams from top institutions internationally. This included entrants from the United States, France, and Italy. In 2010, UWNRG placed third place overall in the Mobile Microrobotics Challenge. Out of the registered teams, UWNRG was the only undergraduate and the only Canadian team competing. The competition required creating a robot under 600 micrometers in all dimensions and competing in challenges designed to test mobility, agility and control, such as the 2 mm dash, a challenge to move the robot in a figure 8 pattern, and microassembly challenges that involve using the robot to pack small triangular pegs together.

== Members ==
The team is made up of entirely undergraduate students from the University of Waterloo. The members of the team are divided into several independent sub-teams: one mechanical team responsible for designing the robot framework, the chemical team who are responsible for integrating our robots with nanotechnology, the business development team who are responsible for finding sponsors for the team, and the marketing team who organize outreach events and conferences for the team. The associated University of Waterloo professors currently include Dr. Mustafa Yavuz.
