= Origins Institute =

Coordinates: 43.25846°N 79.92014°W

The Origins Institute (OI) is an interdisciplinary science research institute at McMaster University in Hamilton, Ontario. It began its operations as an institute on July 1, 2004. The OI's vision is to promote origins research that addresses fundamental, unresolved big questions in science, such as: "How did the universe begin?", "How did stars, galaxies and planets form?", "What is the origin of matter and of the elements?", "How did life begin on Earth, and can it also develop on other planets?", "What was the nature of the Universal Ancestor, and how did life evolve from it?", and "How did intelligent beings arise and evolve on Earth"?.

The Origins Institute research is categorized into six interconnecting themes:

1. space-time (particle physics)
2. elements and matter (nuclear astrophysics)
3. structure of the universe (astronomy)
4. life (evolutionary biology, astrobiology)
5. species (biodiversity)
6. consciousness (neuroscience).

Reflecting the trans-disciplinary nature of the research done at the OI, professional members within the institute hail from many fields, including anthropology, astrobiology, astrophysics, biochemistry, biology, chemistry, mathematics, neuroscience, and philosophy.

Ralph Pudritz, a theoretical astrophysicist at McMaster, spearheaded the OI project and was its first director. Jonathon Stone, a computational biologist from McMaster, was the institute's first associate director. Well-known academics David Deamer, Martin Rees and Stuart Kauffman sit on the OI advisory council. The current director of the institute is Professor Paul Higgs.

== Outreach and conferences ==
One of the focuses of the Origins Institute is public outreach. To that end, the OI hosts an annual season of public lectures and weekly colloquia that draw in top scientists from around the world. The OI also runs a 3D theatre to show movies on scientific topics to the public. The OI furthermore hosts scientific conferences that address origins themes. Its meeting have included 'Astrobiology and the Origins of Life' (May 2005), 'The Genomics Revolution and the Origin of Humanity' (August 2006), 'Origins of Dark Energy', organized jointly with the Perimeter Institute (May 2007), 'Darwin's Legacy: Natural Selection as an Organising Principle in Science' (May 2009) in celebration of the 150th anniversary of Darwin's "Origin of Species", 'The Origins of Stars and Their Planetary Systems' (June 2012), 'Star Formation Jamboree' (May 2013), and 'The Origins and Evolution of Bacterial Genomes" (Dec 2014).

== List of directors ==
- 2004 - 2015 - Ralph Pudritz
- 2015- ?? Paul Higgs

Current director: Jonathon Stone

== List of associate directors ==
- 2004 - 2015 - Jonathon Stone
