= Ralph Pudritz =

Ralph E. Pudritz is a theoretical astrophysicist tenured at McMaster University in Hamilton, Ontario, Canada. He is an expert in the field of astrophysical jets, particularly those involved in star formation.

Professor Pudritz obtained his undergraduate degree at the University of British Columbia, and pursued graduate studies in physics at the University of Toronto and the University of British Columbia. He accepted a position at McMaster in 1986, and has since been on research leaves to the Max Planck Institute, the Center for Astrophysics | Harvard & Smithsonian, Caltech among several others. The Long-Range Planning Council of the National Research Council of Canada chose Pudritz to chair its 1999 plan for the future of astrophysics in Canada. The Herzberg Institute of Astrophysics, the US National Radio Observatory and the NATO Institute for Advanced Study are a few of the organizations for which Pudritz has served as advisor.

In 2004 Pudritz spearheaded the formation of the Origins Institute, a multi-disciplinary scientific endeavour based at McMaster, and became its first director.
