= Ontario Genomics =

- Company type: Nonprofit organization
- Founded: Toronto, Ontario, Canada
- Headquarters: MaRS Discovery District

Former logo

Ontario Genomics, formerly the Ontario Genomics Institute, is a not-for-profit organization that manages genomics research projects and platforms. Ontario Genomics is funded by the Ontario government and the federal research agency Genome Canada.

== History ==
Ontario Genomics was established in 2000, following a landmark decision by the Canadian Government to support the science of genomics.

Since its inception, Ontario Genomics has:

- Raised more than $1 billion for genomics research in Ontario and directly supported 7300 R&D jobs
- Secured over $375M federal Genome Canada funds, $103M provincial (Ministry of Research Innovation and Science) co-funding, and $180M direct industry investments for Ontario genomics research programs.
- Brought 16 genomics companies to the “investor-ready” stage and helped secure $197M follow on funding. These companies created 289 private sector jobs and generated $56.3M in revenue.
