= Ontario Institute for Cancer Research =

Nonprofit cancer research institute

Coordinates: 43°39′35.29″N 79°23′20.08″W

- Established: 2005
- Research type: Cancer
- Field of research: Genomics, Bioinformatics, Drug Discovery, Imaging, Cancer Stem Cells, Immuno- and Bio-therapies, Clinical Trials, Health Services Research
- Staff: 300+
- Address: MaRS Centre, 661 University Avenue, Suite 510
- Location: Toronto, Ontario, Canada
- Website: www.oicr.on.ca

The Ontario Institute for Cancer Research (OICR) is a not-for-profit organization based in Toronto, Ontario, Canada that focuses on research into the prevention, early detection, diagnosis and treatment of cancer. OICR intends to make Ontario more effective in knowledge transfer and commercialization while maximizing the health and economic benefits of research findings for the people of Ontario. OICR was launched in 2005 by the Government of Ontario, which provides funding through the Ministry of Colleges, Universities, Research Excellence and Security. The Institute employs more than 300 people at its research hub at the MaRS Centre in downtown Toronto and funds more than 1,900 scientific staff at hospital-based research institutes and universities around the province. In 2018 it was the highest funder of cancer research in Canada.

== History ==
=== Ontario Cancer Research Network ===
OICR’s predecessor organization was the Ontario Cancer Research Network (OCRN), a not-for-profit corporation established by the Government of Ontario in November 2001 to increase translational research related to the development of new cancer therapies. OCRN’s four main program areas were: the Ontario Tumour Bank, Clinical Trials Programs, the Ontario Cancer Research Ethics Board and the Cancer Research Fund. The organization was headed by Robert A. Phillips.

=== Ontario Institute for Cancer Research ===
In May 2005 the Government of Ontario announced its intent to launch a new cancer research institute in the province. OCRN was asked to evolve into the new institute, which would later be named OICR. OICR was formally launched by Ontario Premier Dalton McGuinty in December 2005. OICR was designed to continue OCRN’s translational research programs while building new research capacity in the province. Thomas J. Hudson was appointed President and Scientific Director of OICR in June 2006 and Robert A. Phillips was appointed Deputy Director. Hudson consulted with the Ontario cancer research community and external experts to develop a strategic research plan for the Institute in 2006. In February 2007 the completed strategic plan was approved by the Ministry of Research and Innovation. Laszlo Radvanyi served as President and Scientific Director of OICR from May 2018 until October, 2024. Longtime OICR Executives Christine Williams and Lincoln Stein were appointed the Institute’s Acting President and Acting Scientific Director in October 2024.

The 2021-2026 strategic plan commits to integrating patient perspective and insight via patient partnership in cancer research. OICR is funded by the Ontario Ministry of Colleges, Universities, Research Excellence and Security.

== Cancer Research ==
=== Resources ===
OICR hosts a number of cancer research resources, including the Ontario Cancer Research Ethics Board (OCREB); the Ontario Tumour Bank (OTB); the Ontario Health Study, the Ontario arm of the CanPath longitudinal study - the largest such study in Canada; and the Canadian Cancer Clinical Trials Network (3CTN).

=== Commercialization ===
As part of its mandate to bring economic benefit to Ontario through cancer research, OICR has a partner organization that focuses on commercialization, FACIT. FACIT provides seed funding to Ontario-based cancer research companies and helps them attract other investors and bring products to market. It claims to have attracted $1.6 billion in investment from $50 million in funding. Notable investments includes Fusion Pharmaceuticals, which was purchased by AstraZeneca for up to $2.4 billion in 2024, and Turnstone Biologics, which is listed on the Nasdaq stock exchange. It hosts an annual pitch competition called Falcons' Fortunes, in the style of the Dragons' Den television series.

=== Notable people ===
John Edgar Dick - Cancer stem cell researcher

Lincoln Stein - Bioinformatics and Computational biology researcher
