= National Disease Research Interchange =

American nonprofit organization

The National Disease Research Interchange (NDRI), based in Philadelphia, Pennsylvania, is a 501(c)(3) nonprofit organization founded in 1980. NDRI serves as a liaison between tissue procurement sources and the research community.

== Operations ==
NDRI partners with a nationwide network of over 130 tissue source sites (TSS) throughout the United States, including organ procurement organizations (OPO), tissue banks, eye banks, and hospitals.

NDRI is funded in part by the National Institutes of Health, public and private foundations and organizations, pharmaceutical and biotechnology corporations.
