= Technological and industrial history of Canada =

The technological and industrial history of Canada encompasses the country's development in the areas of transportation, communication, energy, materials, public works, public services (health care), domestic/consumer and defense technologies. Most technologies diffused in Canada came from other places; only a small number actually originated in Canada. For more about those with a Canadian origin, see Invention in Canada.

The terms chosen for the "age" described below are both literal and metaphorical. They describe the technology that dominated the period in question but are also representative of a large number of other technologies introduced during the same period. Also of note is the fact that the period of diffusion of a technology can begin modestly and can extend well beyond the "age" of its introduction. To maintain continuity, the treatment of its diffusion is dealt with in the context of its dominant "age". For example, the "Steam Age" here is defined as being from 1840 to 1880. However, steam-powered boats were introduced in 1809, the CPR was completed in 1885 and railway construction in Canada continued well into the 20th century. To preserve continuity, the development of steam, in the early and later years, is therefore considered within the "Steam Age".

Technology is a major cultural determinant, no less important in shaping human lives than philosophy, religion, social organization, or political systems. In the broadest sense, these forces are also aspects of technology. The French sociologist Jacques Ellul defined "la technique" as the totality of all rational methods in every field of human activity so that, for example, education, law, sports, propaganda, and the social sciences are all technologies in that sense. At the other end of the scale, common parlance limits the term's meaning to specific industrial arts.

== Stone Age: Fire (14,000 BC – AD 1600) ==
The diffusion of technology in what is now Canada began with the arrival of the first humans about 14,000 BC.

These people brought with them stone and bone tools. These took the form of arrowheads, axes, blades, scrappers, needles, harpoon heads and fishhooks used mostly to kill animals and fish for food and skins. They also brought fire, which they used for heating their dwellings and for cooking which was done on open fires. There were no clay pots or ovens.

In the Arctic, the Innu used stick frames covered with animal skins for shelter during the summer months, while they built houses made of snow or igloos during the harsh winter. On the plains, native peoples used the well known teepee. This consisted of a number of poles arranged to form a conical structure which was in turn covered with animal skins. In central Canada, the long house was popular. This large structure was built from interwoven branches and could house 70 to 80 people. Several of these structures would be built together to form a village which was often surrounded by a palisade of logs stuck vertically into the ground as protection from hostile tribes. On the west coast, native peoples constructed dwellings made from heavy timber. These structures were built near the water's edge and were often decorated with elaborate and elegant carved images.

Transportation techniques were simple. The aboriginal peoples did not have the wheel, horses or the sail. The paddle powered canoe was the most common means of transport and was especially practical during the summer, considering the large number of lakes and rivers that characterized the topography. The dugout was favoured in the waters off the west coast. Summer travel also saw use of the travois, a simple type of sled that was pulled over the ground by a dog and used to transport a light load. In the winter snow shoes made walking in the deep snow practical. Winter transport in the Arctic made use of dog teams, and in warmer summer months, use of kayaks was common.

Clothing was made of animal skins, which were cut with stone and bone tools and sewn with bone needles and animal sinews. Native peoples did not have textiles.

For the most part native peoples were hunters and gatherers, chasing large animals, and fishing for a source of protein. Wild plants and fruits were also an important food source. A common, easily stored and readily transportable food was pemmican, dried powdered meat mixed with fat, berries and "vegetables". In central Canada, there was limited agriculture which allowed the storage of some food during times of privation. Of note was that they did not have the plough or draught animals.

The first peoples had techniques for dealing with disease. Medicines included those made from high bush cranberries, oil of wintergreen and bloodroot. A type of tea made from the bark of the spruce or hemlock could prevent or cure scurvy.

The first peoples did not have a written language. Their extensive knowledge of the natural world and information relating to their customs and traditions was passed orally.

Weapons of war were made by hand from wood and stone. The long range weapon of these times was the bow and arrow with an effective range of up to 100 metres. Close in fighting was conducted with a range of simple armaments including stone-tipped spears, stone axes (tomahawks), stone blades used as knives and stone and wooden clubs of various types. Because there was no knowledge of metalworking with the exception of some small items of jewelry made from copper, weapons such as swords and metal knives were not part of this early arsenal.

== Age of Sail (1600–1830) ==
The arrival of white explorers and colonists in the 16th century introduced those technologies popular in Europe at the time, such as iron making, the wheel, writing, paper, printing, books, newspapers, long range navigation, large ship construction, stone and brick and mortar construction, surgery, firearms, new crops, livestock, the knife fork and spoon, china plates and cups, cotton and linen cloth, horses and livestock.

=== Transportation: shipbuilding and the wheel ===
The use of wind and water as sources of power were major developments in the technological history of the new colonies. Ships with large masts and huge canvas sails maintained the link between the colonies. Jean Talon established the Royal Dockyard on the St. Charles River in Quebec City and the first 120-ton vessel was launched there in 1666. Three other ships, including a 450-ton "galiotte", were built before Talon's departure for France in 1672 and four more were built in Quebec between 1704 and 1712 followed by another nine between 1714 and 1717. Work at the Royal Dockyard recommenced in 1739 and by 1744, twelve vessels had been constructed there, including the Canada, a 500-ton merchantman. Demand for ships was such that a second Royal Dockyard was established in 1746, on the St. Lawrence at the foot of Cap Diamante, where the largest vessel of the French Regime, a 72-gun, 800-ton war ship was built. The fall of New France to the British in 1759 put an end to these activities.

However, the beginning of the 19th century witnessed a revival. The British loss of the American colonies with their associated shipbuilding industry, the subsequent British loss of Baltic sources of timber, as well as Canada's abundant supply of wood along with the tradition of shipbuilding established in New France made British North America an ideal location for a renewed shipbuilding industry. Quebec City and Saint John, New Brunswick, both centres of timber export also became dominant centres for this activity not only in Canada but worldwide. The ships intended for trade, mostly with Britain and common designs, included the two-masted brig and brigantine, and the popular barque, with three masts or more. Designs of between 500 and 1000 tons, which sacrificed speed in favour of a voluminous hold, were well-suited to the carriage of timber and therefore preferred. The Californian and Australian gold rushes of 1848 and 1851 respectively further fed the demand for Canada's large ocean vessels. However, the arrival of the iron and steel-hulled steamship associated with the Canadian inability to adapt to this new technology eventually bankrupted the industry in the latter years of the century.

Inland travel by the coureurs de bois was by way of an Indian invention, the canoe. The York boat and bateau were also popular for travel on inland waters. The York boat was used by traders working for the Hudson's Bay Company and was named after the fur trading post at York Factory on Hudson Bay. The York boat was larger, more stable, and had a greater carrying capacity than the canoe. The first was built in 1794 and numbers of these craft navigated the rivers of the northern prairie region as far west as Fort Chipewyan until replaced by the steamboat in the 19th century. The flat-bottomed bateau was another craft used on Canada's inland waters by both British and French colonists in the 18th and 19th centuries.

Within settlements, transport was often simply a matter of walking around town. The horse, introduced by the new arrivals in 1665, also provided a new and convenient mode of transport. The wooden cart, wagon and carriage, made possible by the introduction of the wheel in combination with the horse, dramatically improved the transport of people and goods. The first graded road in Canada was built by Samuel de Champlain in 1606 and linked the settlement at Port Royal to Digby Cape, 16 kilometres away. By 1734 Quebec City and Montreal were connected by a road, Le chemin du roi, along the north shore of the St. Lawrence. The 267 km distance could be traversed with great difficulty and discomfort by horse-drawn carriage in four to five days. Most roads were of very poor quality especially in wet weather. To overcome this problem logs were often placed side by side crosswise to cover ruts, puddles and mud holes. The result was a more solid but very bumpy surface that was referred to as a corduroy road. Work on what would be called the, "longest street in the world", formally known as Yonge Street, began in York (Toronto), in 1795 under the direction of Deputy Surveyor General Augustus Jones. Initially a trail, it ran from Eglinton Avenue to St. Albans (Holland Landing) and later much further north. The task of widening the path into a road fell to local farmers. The period also saw the construction a number of important canals, including the Rideau Canal, Ottawa–Kingston, 1820, the Lachine Canal, Montreal, 1825, the Ottawa River Canals at Grenville and Carillon, Quebec, 1834 and the Chambly Canal, Chambly, Quebec, 1843.

=== Communication, symbolic language ===
The introduction of written language and mathematics to the new world was of paramount importance. The 26-letter, Roman-based alphabet that formed the basis for French and English words was arguably much more flexible that the pictographs that characterized eastern languages. The pen along with ink and paper made written communication possible and allowed private individuals, businessmen, the clergy and government officials to produce the documents essential for social, commercial, religious and political intercourse. This created a need for mail service. Messages were originally carried between settlements on the St. Lawrence by canoe. After 1734, the road between Montreal and Quebec was used by a special courier to carry official dispatches. In 1755 a post office was opened in Halifax by Benjamin Franklin, the Post Master of the British colonies, as part of a trans-Atlantic mail service that he established between Falmouth, England and New York. In 1763, Franklin opened other post offices in Quebec City, Trois-Rivières and Montreal with a link from the latter city to New York and the trans-Atlantic service. The War of American Independence seriously disrupted mail service in Canada but by 1783 peace had been restored and Hugh Finlay was appointed Post Master for the northern colonies in 1784. That same year Finlay hired Pierre Durand to survey an all-Canadian mail route to Halifax. The path chosen took 15 weeks for a round trip!

Although the written word was a vital part of communications, French colonial policy opposed the establishment of newspapers in New France. Canada's first paper, the Halifax Gazette, produced on a simple printing press, began publication in 1752 under the watchful eye of John Bushell. In 1764, the Quebec Gazette was established in Quebec City by William Brown and Thomas Gilmore. The Montreal Gazette was founded in that city in 1785 by Fleury Mesplet. Other newspapers followed including the Upper Canada Gazette at Newark (Niagara-on-the-Lake) in 1793, the first newspaper in what is now Ontario, the Quebec City Mercury, 1805, the Montreal Herald, 1811, Le Canadien 1806, La Minerve, 1826, and the Colonial Advocate and Novascotian both in 1824. These publications were simple affairs, typeset by hand, consisting of only a few pages, produced in limited quantities on simple presses and of limited distribution.

=== Energy ===
Wind power was used to some to turn the sails of the windmill, which did not come into widespread use. However water power was used extensively to power grist mill in both New France and later, Quebec and Upper Canada and Lower Canada. Animal power in the form of the horse or ox was used to work the fields. The first horses were introduced to New France in 1665. Fire from a wood or oil fuel source was not new but the use of stone fireplaces and ovens along with metal pots and pans dramatically changed the nature of cooking.

=== Industry ===
Between the 1530s and 1626, Basque whalers (whaling) frequented the waters of Newfoundland and the north shore of the Gulf of St. Lawrence from the Strait of Bell Isle to the mouth of the Saguenay River. They constructed stone ovens ashore for fires to melt whale fat. However, as whales became scarce, the cod fishery (fishing) off the Grand Banks of Newfoundland became hotly contested by the British and French, in the 16th and 17th centuries. The British used small boats close to shore from which they caught the cod with hook and line. They practised the "dry fishery" technique which involved shore based settlements for the drying of cod on flakes or racks placed in the open air for their subsequent transport back to Europe. The French on the other hand practised the "green fishery" which involved processing the catch with salt aboard ship. At the same time a fleet of schooners fishing for cod, halibut, haddock, and mackerel became prominent off the Atlantic coast. The use of the long line and purse seine net increased the size of the catch.

It is ironic that a phenomenon as fickle as fashion would be responsible for the economic development and exploration of half a continent, but such was the case with the fur trade in North America between 1650 and 1850. The subject of bitter rivalry between the British and French Empires and inter-corporate rivalry among a number of business organizations, notably the Hudson's Bay Company and the North West Company, the technology of the trade was the picture of simplicity. Traders, be they French or British, would set out in birch bark canoes loaded with trade goods (knives, axe heads, cloth blankets, alcohol, firearms and other items) and travel west along Canada's numerous rivers, streams and lakes in search of Indians and exchange these items for beaver skins. The skins came from animals trapped by the native peoples and worn as clothing during the long cold Canadian winter. The skins were worn with the fur side next to the skin, and by the spring the long hairs would be worn away, leaving the short hairs which were used to make felt. The skins were then carried by the traders in their canoes back to trading posts in Montreal or on Hudson Bay and transported by sailing ship to England or France. There they were processed by a technique involving mercury, and the felt that resulted from the treatment was used to make beaver hats. This coincidentally gave rise to the associated phenomenon of the mad hatter. A combination of diminishing beaver stocks and a change in fashion that saw a decline in the popularity of the beaver hat put an end to the trade.

Agriculture was an essential colonial activity. The settlers who founded Port Royal in Acadia in 1605 drained coastal marshes with a system of dikes and grew vegetables, flax and wheat and raised livestock. After 1713, the British promoted the Maritimes as a source of hemp for rope for the Royal Navy, with moderate success. Mixed farming, the growing of wheat and the raising of livestock would characterize the nature of maritime agriculture well into the mid-19th century. In 1617, Louis Hebert a colonist in Quebec began to raise cattle and grow peas, grain and corn on a very small plot. In the 1640s, charter companies promoted agriculture and settlers cleared forested land with the use of axes, oxen, horses and asses. In 1663, Louis XIV, through his colonial administrators Colbert and Jean Talon took steps to promote the cultivation of hops and hemp and the raising of livestock. By 1721, the harvest of the farmers of New France consisted predominantly of wheat and the census of horses, pigs, cattle and sheep registered 30,0000 animals. In the latter part of the century, the British promoted the cultivation of potatoes. The arrival of the Loyalists in Upper Canada (where they were given the title United Empire Loyalists) in the late 18th century resulted in the cultivation of hemp but agriculture was dominated by the wheat culture well into the mid-19th century.

The techniques for the production of beer were quickly introduced to colonial life. The first commercial brewery in Canada was built in Quebec City in 1668 by Jean Talon. This was followed by the construction of other breweries including those of John Molson in Montreal, 1786, Alexander Keith, Halifax, 1820, Thomas Carling, London, 1840, John Kinder Labatt, London, 1847 and Eugene O'Keefe in Toronto in 1891. Of note is the fact that the first patent awarded by the government of Canada went to Mr. G. Riley in 1842 for "an improved method of brewing ale, beer, porter, and other maltliquors.

Money, then as now was of vital interest to individuals and to the functioning of the economy. The first coin produced for use in New France was the "Gloria Regni", a silver piece struck in Paris in 1670. The first paper money in New France consisted of playing cards signed by the governor and issued in 1685 to help deal with the chronic shortage of coins. After 1760, the British introduced the sterling, which officially stood as Canada's currency for almost a century. However, the monetary system was a chaotic affair and the British coins and paper were circulated along with Spanish dollars, Nova Scotia provincial money, US dollars and gold coins and British paper "army bills" used to buy supplies in the War of 1812. In 1858 the government of the Province of Canada began keeping its accounts in Canadian dollars and to circulate its own paper currency alongside the paper dollars circulated by the Bank of Montreal and other banks.

=== Materials ===
The Europeans brought with them metal and textiles and the knowledge of the means to make them. Les Forges de St. Maurice, which began producing iron in 1738 at facilities near Trois-Rivières and the Marmora Ironworks (established in 1822 near Peterborough), were the first iron works in Canada. Both ceased operations in the latter part of the 19th century.

Early 16th century female settlers along the St. Lawrence and in Acadia were almost all were familiar with the techniques of spinning yarn and weaving cloth for everyday clothes and bedding and the home production of textiles eventually became an important cottage industry. The spinning wheel and loom were features of many colonial homes and weaving techniques included the "à la planche" and "boutonné" methods. Loyalist women settling in Upper and Lower Canada grew flax and raised sheep for wool to make clothing, blankets and linen. The Jacquard loom, introduced in the 1830s, featured a complex system of punch cards to control the pattern and was the first programmable machine in Canada. With the arrival of industrial textile mills in Montreal and Toronto in the late 19th century, the economic advantage of home weaving faded.

Wood ash became a significant export during this period. Potash made from the ashes of burnt wood was used as a bleaching and dying agent in textile production in Britain. Wood ash and pearl ash (potash mixed with lime) were shipped overseas as early as 1767 and export reached a peak in the mid-19th century. In 1871, there were 519 asheries in operation in Canada. Wood ash was also used in the home by colonials to make soap.

=== Medicine ===
Medical treatment at this time reflected techniques available in France and was provided by a barber-surgeon. The first in New France was Robert Giffard, who arrived in Quebec City in 1627 and "practised" at Hôtel-Dieu, Canada's first hospital, a very modest four-room structure founded by the church. The panacea was bleeding, which involved the use of a knife to cut open a blood vessel and drain away a quantity of the patient's blood. There was some surgery, but it was undertaken with primitive instruments and without anesthetic or any familiarity with the concept of infection. Both the procedure and results were usually quite gruesome. Another figure of repute, Michel Sarrazin, a botanist as well as doctor, arrived from France in the latter half of the 17th century and served as the surgeon-major for the French troops in New France. He, too, practised at Hotel-Dieu and while there treated hundreds of patients infected during a typhus epidemic. Eyeglasses for the correction of vision became available at this time. The mercury thermometer, invented in 1714, became a useful diagnostic tool for doctors as did the stethoscope invented in 1816. Because doctors were few and far between people with medical problems often had to treat themselves. They used Indian medicines or home remedies based on the internal and external application of various herbal and animal products. Advances in surgery came in the early 19th century with the innovative work of Christopher Widmer who practised at York Hospital (later known as Toronto General Hospital) and R.W. Beaumont made a name as a noted inventor of surgical instruments. The early part of the 19th century also witnessed the first halting steps with respect to the use of inoculation in Nova Scotia, in this case against smallpox. However, it would take another one hundred years for the practice to become widespread. General hospitals were established in Montreal in 1819 and York (now Toronto) in 1829.

=== Domestic technology ===
The first houses in Canada were constructed at Port Royal on the Annapolis River in what is now Nova Scotia in 1605. The colonists built simple wooden frame homes with peaked roofs around a central courtyard. This established a housebuilding tradition that lasts to this day, for by far the most common domestic structure in Canada for the last 400 years has been the wood-frame peak-roofed house. Most domestic homes in New France from about 1650 to 1750, both urban and rural, were simple wooden structures. Wood was inexpensive, readily available and easily worked by most residents. Rooms were small, usually limited to a living/dining/kitchen space and perhaps a bedroom. Roofs were usually peaked to deflect the rain and very heavy snow. After fires in Quebec City in 1682 and Montreal in 1721, building codes emphasized the importance of stone construction, but these requirements were mostly ignored except by the most affluent. The most popular type of domestic dwelling in Loyalist Upper Canada in the late 18th century was the log house or the wood-frame house (or, less commonly, the stone house). When homes were heated, it was by a fireplace burning wood or a cast-iron wood stove, which was also used for cooking, and they were lit by candlelight or whale oil lamp. Kerosene lamps became popular in the 1840s, when Gesner of Halifax developed an effective way to manufacture that product. Water for drinking and washing was carried to the home from an outside source. Tables and chairs, items unknown to Canada's native peoples, were introduced and had an important place in the home.

The new arrivals also brought new eating habits. Meat from animals such as cows, sheep, chickens and pigs was common, as were new types of fruits and vegetables. These items were eaten fresh but could be stored for later consumption if salted, pickled or frozen. Grain was ground to flour at the local grist mill and baked in the home oven with yeast to make bread. Hopps, grain and fruit were fermented to make beer, hard alcohol and wine. Meals were served on pewter or china plates and eaten with a metal knife, fork and spoon. The places were set on a simple wooden table with wooden chairs often made by the man of the house.

Musical instruments did much to enliven the colonial life. In the well-known documents The Jesuit Relations, there is reference to the playing of the fiddle in 1645 and the organ (music) in 1661. Quebec City boasted of Canada's first piano in 1784.

=== Waste disposal ===
Sewage and garbage disposal were simple tasks in the mostly rural parts of the colonies. Sewage was dumped into a stream or left in pits and buried. Scrap food was fed to farm animals and any other garbage or waste was burned or placed in a quiet corner of the property and left to deteriorate. However, in towns such as Halifax, Quebec City, Montreal and York (Toronto), these tasks became more difficult due to lack of space and the concentrated population, and the result was very unpleasant. Streets reeked with the smell of decaying garbage as well as pig, horse and cow excrement. Markets were places of animal blood, rotting animal carcasses and fish heads and other decaying organic matter. Human excrement was stored in pails in buildings and then dumped into the streets. Not until the mid-19th and early 20th centuries would these problems be effectively addressed through the installation of sewer systems and the organization of municipal garbage collection.

=== Military technology ===
The Europeans introduced extremely important innovations relating to warfare: gunpowder, the cannon and the musket. The cannon was used to arm a number of important military structures, including the Citadel of Quebec, Quebec City, Quebec (1745), the Fortress of Louisburg, Louisburg, Nova Scotia (1745), and Fort Henry, Kingston, Ontario, 1812. They were also the primary weapon aboard the warships of the era. French regular soldiers stationed in New France and British regulars stationed in British North America after 1763 were equipped with a musket and bayonet. Ironically, in the Battle of Quebec, the French General Montcalm ordered his troops out of the ultra-modern stone-walled Citadel with its heavy defensive cannon and onto the adjacent Plains of Abraham where they were felled by a single volley of musket fire from the British line. Both the British/Canadian/Native troops and American troops were equipped with cannons and muskets when invading American armies attacked Canada in 1775 and again during the period from 1812 to 1814 with the intent of annexation. In both cases, the invaders were defeated.

== Steam Age (1830–1880) ==
The pace of diffusion quickened in the 19th century with the introduction of such technologies as steam power and the telegraph. Indeed, it was the introduction of steam power that allowed politicians in Ottawa to entertain the idea of creating a transcontinental state. In addition to steam power, municipal water systems and sewer systems were introduced in the latter part of the century. The field of medicine saw the introduction of anesthetic and antiseptics.

=== Steam power ===
Steam power was first introduced to Canada via the paddle-powered steamboat. The Accommodation, a side-wheeler built entirely in Montreal by the Eagle Foundry and launched in 1809, was the first steamer to ply Canadian waters, making its maiden voyage from Montreal to Quebec that same year in 36 hours. Other paddle-wheel steamboats included the Frontenac, Lake Ontario (1816), the General Stacey Smyth, Saint John River (1816), the Union, lower Ottawa River (1819), the Royal William, Quebec to Halifax (1831), and the Beaver, BC coast (1836).

One of the largest trans-Atlantic steamship lines was established in Montreal in 1854. The Allan Line Royal Mail Steamers company, founded by Sir Hugh Allan, operated a fleet of over 100 oceangoing steam ships, plying the route between Montreal and Britain from that date until 1917, when it was sold to Canadian Pacific Ocean Services Limited.

The first steam locomotive-powered railway service in Canada was offered by the Champlain and St. Lawrence Railroad, Quebec, in 1836. Other railway systems soon followed, including the Albion Mines Railway, Nova Scotia (1839), the St. Lawrence and Atlantic Railroad (1853), the Great Western Railway, Montreal to Windsor (1854), the Grand Trunk Railway, Montreal to Sarnia (1860), the Intercolonial Railway (1876), the Chignecto Marine Transport Railway, Tignish, Nova Scotia (1888), the Edmonton, Yukon & Pacific Railway (1891), the Newfoundland Railway, St. John's, Newfoundland and Labrador (1893), the White Pass and Yukon Railway, Whitehorse, Yukon Territory (1900), the Kettle Valley Railway, British Columbia (1916) and Canadian National Railways (1917).

One of the great engineering works of the world, the Canadian Pacific Railway and its associated Canadian Pacific trans-Canada telegraph system, was completed in 1885. Between 1881 and 1961, CPR would operate 3,267 steam locomotives.

The stagecoach came into its own in the mid-19th century. Roads in early colonial Canada were poor and not well-suited to long-distance travel by horse-drawn coach. For this reason, the stage coach was used mostly for short-distance travel and long distance inter-city passenger service was mostly by water. With the introduction of the steam locomotive, long distance inter-city passenger service boomed. However, a means of conveyance was required serve small towns that found themselves short distances from "the end of the line" or beyond the reach of local public horse car service. The stage coach was well-suited to this role. From about 1850 until 1900, in parallel with the explosive growth of the rail network all across Canada, the service grew. However, the ever-expanding reach of the rail network spread eventually even to small towns. The small size of the markets served and arrival of cars and buses put an end to this colourful means of transportation in the early 20th century.

In Western Canada throughout the 19th century, the Carlton Trail served as an important land transportation route over its 1500 km length from Winnipeg (Fort Garry) to Edmonton, (Upper Fort des Prairies). The simple horse-drawn Red River Cart was a common sight on the road. Another overland series of roads, the Red River Trails, connected Fort Garry to the US.

Manned flight came to Canada during these years. On 4 August 1840, a hot air balloon took to the air for the first time in Canada when the "Star of the East", piloted by aeronaut Louis Lauriat, rose into the sky over Saint John, New Brunswick.

=== Universal time ===
The measurement of time before the coming of the railways was a local matter with towns and cities establishing their own "time zones". There was little coordination of times between cities or regions in Canada or elsewhere in the world. Train travel revealed the shortcomings of this arrangement for it quickly led to problems related to the scheduling of arrivals and departures from different cities. A Canadian engineer, Sandford Fleming, proposed a coordinated worldwide time system at a meeting in Toronto of the Royal Canadian Institute in 1879. His idea was accepted at the International Meridian Conference of 1884.

=== Communication ===
Canada's initial telegraph service, introduced in 1846, was offered by the Toronto, Hamilton and Niagara Electro-Magnetic Telegraph Co. Others soon followed, including the telegraph system of the Montreal Telegraph Company, 1847 and the telegraph system of the Dominion Telegraph Company, 1868. The production and transmission of the signal was by means of analog technology, and its introduction would form the backbone of communication and computing technology in Canada for the next 140 years.

In 1856, the first underwater telegraph cable in Canada was laid, linking Cape Ray, Newfoundland and Aspy, Nova Scotia. Ten years later, in 1866, the first transatlantic telegraph cable was laid between Heart's Content, Newfoundland and Foilhommerum, Valentia Island, in western Ireland. The first trans-Canada telegraph service was established by Canadian Pacific Railway in 1885. In 1902, Canadian Pacific completed a trans-Pacific cable telegraph, linking Vancouver with Australia and New Zealand.

The newspaper benefited from the introduction of the telegraph and the rotary press. The latter device, invented in the US, was first used in Canada by George Brown in Toronto starting in 1844 to print copies of the Globe. This process permitted the printing of thousands of copies of each daily paper rather than the mere hundreds of copies possible with previous technologies.

=== Energy and oil ===
Drilling for oil was first undertaken in Canada in 1851 in Enniskillen Township in Lambton County by the International Mining and Manufacturing Company of Woodstock, Ontario. There was fierce competition for oil drilling, refining and distribution in southern Ontario until 1880 when 16 oil refineries merged to form Imperial Oil. This company was in turn acquired in 1898 by John D. Rockefeller's Standard Oil Trust. Oil discovery and development in the west dates from the early 20th century, with Imperial becoming a major player by 1914 at Turner Valley, Alberta and in 1920 at Norman Wells, NWT. British based corporations such as Royal Dutch Shell and Anglo-Persian Oil (British Petroleum) also became involved in oil exploration in the west at this time.

Oil refining required sulfuric acid, and two entrepreneurs, T.H. Smallman and W. Bowman, established the Canadian Chemical Company in London, Ontario in 1867 to manufacture this product for the region's oil industry. This marked the beginning of the mass production of heavy industrial chemicals in Canada.

The discovery of oil and gas led to the construction of Canada's first energy pipelines. In 1853, an iron pipeline from the Maurice River area carried natural gas 25 kilometres to Trois-Rivières, Quebec, where it was used to provide street lighting. In 1862 a pipeline was built to carry oil from wells in Petrolia, Ontario to Sarnia for refining and in 1895 another natural gas pipeline, 20 centimetres in diameter, linked wells in Essex County, Ontario to Windsor and passed under the Detroit River to Detroit.

Coal gas public street lighting systems were introduced in Montreal in 1838, in Toronto in 1841 and in Halifax in 1850. Coal gasification plants were built in these cities and others to provide the gas for the lighting systems. Most remained in operation until the 1950s when they were phased out due to a loss of demand in favour of the more practical and inexpensive natural gas. The decommissioning of these sites was often problematic due to the accumulation of toxic coal tar in the ground.

=== Materials and products ===
Glass manufacturing was introduced at this time. Glass was manufactured at Mallorytown, Upper Canada beginning in 1825. Window glass was produced at the Canada Glass Works in St. Jean, Canada East (Quebec) from 1845 to 1851 and the Ottawa Glass Works at Como in Ottawa, Canada West (Ontario) from 1847 to 1857. Glass was blown to form tubes which were cut lengthwise, unrolled and flattened. Glass bottles were produced starting in 1851 by the Ottawa factory and Foster Brothers Glass Works, in St. Jean starting in 1855. Other manufacturers included: the Canada Glass Works, Hudson, Quebec, 1864–1872 and the Hamilton Glass Company, Hamilton, Ont, 1865–96, which produced "green" glass and the St. Lawrence Glass Company, Montreal, 1867–73 and Burlington Glass Company of Hamilton, Ont, 1874–98 which produced "flint" or clear glass. Rubber footwear was produced by the Canadian Rubber Company in Montreal starting in 1854.

Industrial textile production also took its first steps during these years. In 1826, Mahlon Willett established a woollen cloth manufacturing factory in L'Acadie, Lower Canada and by 1844 the Sherbrooke Cotton Factory in Sherbrooke was producing cotton cloth. This establishment also had powered knitting machines and may therefore have been Canada's first knitting mill before burning down in 1854. There were cloth manufacturing mills in operation at Ancaster, Ontario by 1859, as well as Merritton, Ontario (the Lybster Mills, 1860). In Montreal a cotton mill operated on the banks of the Lachine Canal at the St-Gabriel Lock from 1853 until at least 1871 and Belding Paul & Co., operated Canada's first silk cloth manufacturing factory in that city starting in 1876.

The safety match became available to Canadians about mid-century. The technology, which separated the chemicals for match ignition, some on the match head and some on the striking surface, was invented by J.E. Lundstrom in Sweden in 1855. Canadian production began in 1856 when Ezra Butler Eddy began to manufacture safety matches in Hull, Quebec. The E. B. Eddy Company became one of the largest producers of matches in the world.

=== Industrial techniques and processes ===
The lumber industry grew to become one of Canada's most important economic engines during this period. A market for Canadian wood developed in Britain where access to traditional sources of lumber for the construction of ships for the Royal Navy, as well as industrial structures, was blocked by Napoleon in 1806. As a result, Britain turned to her colonies in North America to supply masts for her ships as well as sawn lumber and square timber. Other wood products included barrel staves, shingles, box shooks and spool wood for textile factories. Growth during this period was staggering. In 1805, 9000 loads of lumber arrived in Britain from Canada. In 1807, the total number rose to 27,000 loads, in 1809, 90,000 and by 1846, 750,000 loads.

Water was necessary for the transport of lumber to saw mill and ports as well as providing the power for the saw mills themselves and as a result the forest industry developed along the rivers of New Brunswick, Quebec and Ontario, including the Miramichi, St. John, Ottawa and Gatineau. The logging itself was a winter activity and began with the first snowfall when roads and camps were built in the forest. Trees were cut with steel axes until about 1870 when the two-man crosscut saw was introduced. The felled trees had their branches removed and were hauled over the snow roads by teams of oxen or horses to the nearest frozen stream or river. In the spring melt they would be carried by the rushing water downstream to the mills. Often the logs "jammed" and on the way the lumberjacks would undertake the very dangerous lob of breaking the "jam". Where there were rapids or obstacles, special timber "slides" were constructed to aid transport. Large numbers of logs were often assembled into rafts to aid their movement or into very large booms which drifted down river to mills and market. A number of large firms appeared as a result of this activity including, Cunard and Pollok, Gilmour and Co. in New Brunswick, William Price in Chicoutimi, Quebec and J.R.Booth in Ottawa. The introduction of the railway at mid-century served to decrease the importance of water transport for the industry.

The industry in western Canada and in particular British Columbia did not develop as quickly as in the east but with the exhaustion of the eastern forests and the opening of the Panama Canal in 1914, it eventually overtook the scale of activity in eastern Canada. Different conditions there required different logging techniques. Because the trees were much larger and heavier, three times as many horses or oxen were required to haul them. The more moderate climate meant that the winter snow roads could not be used and instead necessitated the use of log skid roads. Trees were so tall that springboards were wedged into notches cut into the trunk to serve as work platforms for two loggers using heavy double bit steel axes. Human and animal muscle, powered the industry until 1897 when the steam-powered "donkey engine" was introduced in B.C. from the US. This stationary machine drove a winch connected to a rope or wire which was used to haul logs up to 150 metres across the forest floor. A series of such engines placed at intervals could be used to haul large numbers of logs, long distances in relatively short periods of time. The "high lead system" in which a wire or lead suspended in trees was used to haul logs, was also introduced about this time.

Other manufacturing capabilities began to develop during this period, in parallel with shipbuilding. Canada's first paper mill was built in St. Andrews, Quebec in 1805 by two New Englanders and produced paper for sale in Montreal and Quebec City. By 1869 Alexander Burtin was operating Canada's first groundwood paper mill in Valleyfield, Quebec. It was equipped with two wood grinders imported from Germany and produced primarily newsprint. North America's first chemical wood-pulp mill was constructed in Windsor mills, Quebec in 1864 by Angus and Logan. C.B.Wright & Sons began to make "hydraulic cement" in Hull, Quebec in 1830. Leather tanning gained prominence and James Davis among others made a mark in this field in Toronto beginning in 1832. Canada became the world's largest exporter of potash in the 1830s and 1840s. In 1840 Darling & Brady began to manufacture soap in Montreal. E.B.Eddy began to produce matches in Hull, Quebec in 1851. Explosives were manufactured by an increasing number of companies including the Gore Powder Works at Cumminsville, Canada West, 1852, the Canada Powder Company, 1855, the Acadia Powder Company 1862, and the Hamilton Powder Company established that same year. In 1879 that company built Canada's first high explosives manufacturing plant in Beloeil, Quebec. The first salt well was drilled at Goderich, Canada West in 1866. Phosphate fertilizer was first made in Brockville, Ontario in 1869.

The mass production of clothing began at this time. Livingstone and Johnston, later W.R. Johnston & Company, founded in Toronto in 1868, was the first in Canada to cut cloth and sew together the component pieces with the help of the newly introduced sewing machine, as part of a continuous operation.

The technology of photography was introduced during these years. Eleven daguerreotypists were listed in Lovell's Canadian Directory of 1851 while the Canada Classified Directory listed 360 in 1865. Most used the wet collodion process invented by F. Scott Archer in England in 1851.

The growing agricultural activity in southern Ontario and Quebec provided the basis for farm mechanization and the manufacturing industry to meet the demand for agricultural machinery. The area around Hamilton had become attractive for iron and steel industries based on railway construction and the source of this raw material made the same area attractive to aspiring farm implement manufacturers. By about 1850 there were factories producing ploughs, mowers, reapers, seed drills, cutting boxes, fanning mills threshing machines and steam engines, established by entrepreneurs including the well known Massey family, Harris, Wisner, Cockshutt, Sawyer, Patterson, Verity and Wilkinson. Although the industry was located mostly around Hamilton there were other smaller manufacturers in other locations including, Frost and Wood of Smith Falls, Ontario, Herring of Napanee, Ontario Ontario, Harris and Allen of Saint John and the Connell Brothers of Woodstock, both in New Brunswick and Mathew Moody and Sons of Terrebonne and Doré et Fils of La Prairie both in Quebec.

Meat processing had been a local undertaking since the beginning of the colony with the farmer and local butcher providing nearby customers with product. Health concerns were evident from the start and regulations for the butchering and sale of meat were promulgated in New France in 1706 and in Lower Canada in 1805. Activity grew to reach an industrial scale by the middle of the 19th century. Laing Packing and Provisions was founded in Montreal in 1852, F.W. Fearman began processing operations in Hamilton, Ontario and in Toronto William E. Davies established Canada's first large scale hog slaughter house in Toronto in 1874.

The founding of the Canadian Manufacturers Association in 1871 was symptomatic of the growth of this sector of the economy with its related technologies.

The retail industry also experienced considerable innovation during these years at the hands of Timothy Eaton of Toronto. He offered for sale large numbers of "consumer" goods such as clothes, shoes and household items under the roof of one large store and sold them at fixed prices eliminating the concept of barter. This had become possible because of the recent stabilization of the Canadian currency through the creation of the Canadian dollar and the simultaneous appearance of mass-produced goods which allowed uniform pricing for any particular product. In 1884 he created the iconic Eaton's catalogue which formed the basis for his catalogue sales operation which allowed rural dwellers to order and receive by mail or train the products that were available to those who had access to his growing chain of giant urban department stores.

=== Medicine ===
There were dramatic developments in the field of medicine during these years. In 1834, a British surgeon with the Royal Navy suggested a link between sanitation and disease. This led to the establishment of departments of public health across the country by the end of the century and provided an impetus to municipalities to supply clean water to their citizens as noted above. The use of the hypodermic syringe, invented in 1853, was quickly adopted by Canadian doctors. Two other medical innovations also appeared at this time, anesthetic and antiseptic. The use of ether and chloroform as anaesthetics became common in England and the US after 1846. In Canada, Dr. David Parker of Halifax is credited as the first to use anaesthesia during surgery. Antiseptic was being used in the operating rooms of the Montreal and Toronto General hospitals by 1869.

In many cases the only technique for dealing with infectious disease was quarantine and this was the case for leprosy. Canada's first leper colony was established on Sheldrake Island in New Brunswick and operated there from 1844 to 1849 when patients were transferred to a facility at Tracadie, New Brunswick. On the west coast a leper colony was established on D'Arcy Island off the coast of Vancouver Island and patients were treated there until 1924 when it was closed. A number of patients on the island tried to escape by swimming to the larger Vancouver Island.

=== Public works, water, civil engineering and architecture ===
Water distribution systems also became a feature of many Canadian cities during this period and their installation represented the most significant development in public health in Canada's history. Gravity feed systems were in operation in Saint John, New Brunswick in 1837 and Halifax, Nova Scotia in 1848. Steam powered pumping stations were in service in Toronto in 1841, Kingston, Ontario in 1850 and Hamilton, Ontario in 1859. Quebec City had a system by 1854 and Montreal by 1857. Most large cities had steam powered municipal systems by the 1870s. Sewer systems necessarily followed, and with them, the flush toilet in the 1880s, made popular by Crapper in Great Britain at that time.

Coal gas public street lighting systems were introduced in Montreal in 1838, in Toronto in 1841, and in Halifax in 1850. Horse-drawn street rail coaches for public transport were introduced in large Canadian cities about his time. In Montreal the Montreal City Passenger Railway Company, formed in 1861, offered horse car service from 1861 to 1891 when it was replaced by electric streetcar service. Horse car service began in Toronto in 1861 as well and was offered by the Toronto Street Railways until 1892, when it was also replaced by electric streetcar service.

The technology of incarceration was refined during these years. Prisons were built in Quebec City in 1809 and Montreal in 1836. One of the world's largest and most modern prisons, the fortress-like Provincial Penitentiary of the province of Upper Canada, Kingston Penitentiary, opened in that city in 1835. Based on a design by William Powers a deputy warden at the prison in Auburn, New York State, the facility, surrounded by high walls, could hold up to 800 prisoners in minuscule cells measuring 6 feet by 2 feet, separated from each other by stone walls two feet thick. Other prisons of similar design included those at Saint John, New Brunswick, 1839, Halifax, Nova Scotia, 1854, St. John's, Newfoundland, 1859, the Don Jail, Toronto, 1864, the Toronto Central Prison, Toronto, 1873, Saint-Vincent-de-Paul, Montreal, 1873, Stony Mountain, Manitoba, 1877, New Westminster, British Columbia, 1878 and Dorchester Penitentiary, New Brunswick, 1880. Civilians convicted of capital crimes (capital punishment in Canada) were hanged by the neck. This technique included both the "short" and "long" drop. The short drop, killed by suffocation while conscious, while the “more humane” long drop immediately broke the neck, thus rendering the person unconscious before subsequent death by suffocation. Those convicted of capital military offences were shot by firing squad.

Notable works of civil engineering realized during this period included the Chaudière Bridge, Ottawa, in 1828, 1844, and 1919, the Reversing Falls Bridge, Saint John, New Brunswick, 1853 and 1885, the Niagara Falls Suspension Bridge, 1855, The Halifax Citadel, Halifax, Nova Scotia, 1856, Victoria Bridge, Montreal, Quebec, 1859, Canada's first tunnel, the Brockville Railway Tunnel, Brockville, Ontario, 1869, the Kettle Creek Bridge, St. Thomas, Ontario, 1871 and the Grand Rapids Tramway, Grand Rapids, Manitoba, 1877.

The grand hotel made its first appearance during these years with the opening of the Clifton Hotel in Niagara Falls, Upper Canada in 1833. Other hotels of note included St. Lawrence Hall, Montreal, 1851, the Queen's Hotel, Toronto, 1862 and the Tadoussac Hotel, Tadoussac, Quebec, 1865.

Church architecture and construction advanced with the completion of Notre-Dame Basilica (Montreal) in 1843, the Cathedral Church of St. James (Toronto) in 1844 and St. Michael's Cathedral (Toronto) in 1848.

=== Defence ===
The Militia Act of 1855 passed by the Legislature of the Province of Canada established the basis for the Canadian military. The act established seven batteries of artillery, which grew to ten field batteries and 30 batteries of garrison artillery by 1870. Weapons used by these units included the 7-pound smooth-bore muzzle-loading and the 9-pound rifled muzzle-loading (RML) guns.

== Early Electric Age (1880–1900) ==
=== Energy and electricity ===
Public electric lighting received its first Canadian demonstration in Manitoba at the Davis House hotel on Main Street, Winnipeg, March 12, 1873. In 1880, the Manitoba Electric and Gas Light Company was incorporated to provide public lighting and power and in 1893 the Winnipeg Electric Street Railway Company was established. Halifax had electric lights installed by the Halifax Electric Light Company Limited in 1881. The year 1883 saw the introduction of electric street lighting in Victoria, the first city in British Columbia to get public electric power. Vancouver got electricity in 1887. In 1884, the Royal Electric Company began offering commercial power to Montreal. Also in 1884, Saint John, New Brunswick was the first city in that province to have commercially available power delivered by the Saint John Electric Light Company. Edmonton's first power company was established in 1891 and placed street lights along the city's main street, Jasper Avenue. The power company was purchased by the Town of Edmonton in 1902 and to this day remains a municipal government enterprise known as EPCOR.

Initially electricity was generated using a technique that produced direct current to DC. This type of current had the unfortunate property of being difficult to transmit long distances over wires. In 1897 Westinghouse established a manufacturing facility in Hamilton and began producing heavy alternating current (AC) generators and AC motors (based on Serbian-American inventor Nikola Tesla's induction motor) for the Canadian market. AC had an advantage in that it was more amenable to transmission over long distances. The competitor of that company, General Electric of Canada (1892), with production facilities in Peterborough, Ontario eventually followed suit. AC technology has been used for electrical transmission since that time.

=== Transportation ===
With the electrification of cities, large and small, came the electric streetcar. In Montreal, the horse car was withdrawn from service in 1894 and replaced with the electric streetcar, operated by the Montreal Street Railway Company from that date until 1911. Many of the streetcars were manufactured by Canadian Car and Foundry of Montreal and the Ottawa Car Company. In Toronto, the horse car gave way to the electric streetcar in 1892, with that service being offered by the Toronto Railway Company from 1891 to 1921.

The bicycle made its appearance at this time. The "boneshaker", with pedals connected directly to the front wheel, appeared in the Maritimes in 1866 followed by the penny-farthing bicycle after 1876. The machine evolved and was improved with the addition of pneumatic tires, a central crank for the pedals and a coasting back wheel with brake. The increasing popularity of bicycles led to the formation of a national bicycle club, the Canadian Wheelsman in London, Ontario in 1879. In 1899, five important Canadian bicycle manufacturers, Gendron, Goold, Massey-Harris, H.A. Lozier, and Welland Vale, combined to form what would become the very well known Canadian Cycle and Motor Company (CCM), with 1700 employees and an annual production of 40,000 bicycles.

In 1891, the newly formed Canadian Pacific Steamship Lines began offering trans-Pacific steamship service from Vancouver with three large steel-hulled ships, the "Empress", liners, India, China and Japan. A fleet of smaller "Princess" steam ships was used for coastal service and the Great Lakes. Of note is the fact that Canadian Pacific, with its combination of steam ships and steam locomotives, built a transportation empire that spanned more than half the globe. Few other companies anywhere in the world at that time could boast of such an accomplishment.

=== Communication ===
The telephone began to make its mark in Canada, modestly at first. The production, transmission and reception of the sound signal was by means of analog technology which would form the basis of the telephone system for the next century. The telephone system of the Bell Telephone Company of Canada (Bell Canada) was established in 1880.

New printing technologies and the availability of a new material, newsprint, had a dramatic effect on the newspaper industry. By the 1880s, the rotary press had evolved into a high speed machine and with the use of stereotyping allowed the production of large numbers daily papers. In 1876, daily newspaper circulation in Canada's nine major urban centres stood at 113,000 copies. By 1883, it had more than doubled. The introduction of typecasting machines such as the Linotype typesetting machine in the 1890s led to an expansion in size of the individual paper from 8 to 12 pages to 32 or 48 pages. This was also made possible by the availability of cheap newsprint manufactured in huge continuous rolls that could be fitted directly into the high speed presses.

The techniques for book publishing were also firmly established during these years. Publishers of note included, Beauchemin of Montreal, 1842, and Musson Book Co., 1894, and G.N. Morang, 1897.

The techniques of filmmaking were introduced to Canada in 1897. In that year, Manitoban James Freer made a series of films about farm life in western Canada. In 1889–1899, the Canadian Pacific Railway sponsored a successful tour by Freer to present these films in Britain to encourage immigration from that country for the development of the prairies and therefore boost the business of the railway. This inspired the railway to finance the production of additional films and hire a British firm, which created a Canadian arm, the Bioscope Company of Canada, and produced 35 films about Canadian life.

In Montreal in 1900, Emile Berliner, inventor of the gramophone sound recording technique, established the Berliner Gramophone Company and began to manufacture the first phonograph records in Canada, first produced as seven-inch single-sided discs. These records were played on a gramophone, also manufactured by Berliner. They produced sound through purely mechanical means, by rotating the discs on a platter turning at 78 r.p.m. and "reading" the grooves with a metal needle, which caused substantial wear and tear.

=== Heavy manufacturing ===
The first of these companies, CLC, had its origins in the formation of the “Ontario Foundry” established in 1848, but with the production of its first locomotive in 1854, it became known as the Kingston Locomotive Works. It produced 36 locomotives mostly for the new Grand Trunk Railway (GTR) before going broke in 1860. Through a series of corporate reorganizations, the company manufactured locomotives for both the GRT and the Canadian Pacific Railway. In 1901, further reorganization led to the formation of the Canadian Locomotive and Engine Company Ltd. with the company producing one steam locomotive per week. The company was a significant supplier of stream locomotives until the arrival of the diesel in the fifties when it went into decline.

The Montreal Locomotive Works originated with the formation of the Locomotive and Machine Company of Montreal Limited in 1883 to supply the GRT, the CPR and the Intercolonial Railway with locomotives and rolling stock.

The manufacture of streetcars by companies such as Ottawa Car Company, founded in 1891, in Ottawa, and Canadian Car and Foundry established in Montreal in 1909, was also of note. Dominion Bridge Company established in Montreal in 1886, became a well-known heavy engineering firm in the field of bridge building and the construction of steel frames for skyscrapers.

GE Canada, founded by Thomas Edison in Peterborough in 1892, contributed to heavy manufacturing techniques through the fabrication of large electric generators and electric motors at that facility, which were used to supply the rapidly growing Canadian market for electrical generating equipment. Similar heavy electrical products were manufactured by Westinghouse Canada established in Hamilton, Ontario, in 1897.

The growth of western agriculture stimulated the growth of the eastern farm implement industry. Companies such as Bell, Waterloo, Lobsinger, Hergott and Sawyer-Massey were soon shipping their large metal threshing machines and other types of equipment via the CPR to western farms. Arguably the most notable of these corporations was Massey-Harris Co. Ltd. of Toronto, created in 1891 through the merger of Massey Manufacturing Co. (1847) and A. Harris, Son & Co Ltd. (1857) which became the largest manufacturer of farm machinery in the British Empire.

=== Industrial processes and techniques ===
Metal mining also became a significant industry during this period. The invention of the electric dynamo, electroplating and steel in the 1870s created a strong demand for copper and nickel. Hard rock mining became a practical consideration because of the concurrent development of the hard rock drill and dynamite. A copper mine was established in Orford County Quebec in 1877, by the Orford Company while the Canadian Copper Company was founded in 1886 to exploit copper deposits at Sudbury made accessible by the construction of the Canadian Pacific Railway. The ore from that mine was found to contain nickel as well as copper and a technique known as the Orford process using nitrate cake (acid sodium sulphate) was developed to separate the metals. Hard rock gold mining became practical in 1887, with the development of the potassium cyanidation process, by Scott MacArthur, which was used to separate the gold from the ore. This technique was first used in Canada at the Mikado Mine in the Lake-of-the-Woods Region again made accessible by the CPR. The CPR also provided access the B.C. interior where lead, copper, silver and gold ores had been discovered in the Rossland area in 1891. The ores were transported to Trail, B.C. where they were roasted. After CPR built the Crowsnest Pass it purchased the Trail roasting facility and in 1899 built a blast furnace to smelt lead ore.

The techniques of coal mining were introduced to Canada in 1720 in what is now Cape Breton, on a coal seam on the north side of Cow Bay. The coal was used as fuel for the inhabitants at Louisburg. Large scale mining developed the Sydney area in particular and continued until 1876 by which time easily reached deposits had been exhausted. However mining continued with tunnels extending out under the sea. The coal was used to power steam locomotives and in latter years to make steel, provide fuel for central heating and provide the volatile gases that formed the basis for the coal gasification and related chemical industries. In 1893, a number of Nova Scotia collieries including the Bridgeport, Caledonia, Clyde, Gardiner, Glace Bay, Gowrie, Lingan, Lorway, Schooner Pond and Victoria were united to form the Dominion Coal Company which by 1912 produced 40% of Canada's total coal output.

The wheat economy developed on the prairies during these years. Agriculture in that region had begun around the Red River Colony in 1812, based on French Canadian survey techniques for land division and Scottish farming practices. The "infield" consisting of long narrow strips of land rising from the Red River Valley gave way to the "outfield" of pasture lands. Confederation spurred interest in western agriculture with the government of Canada subsequently purchasing Rupert's Land from the Hudson's Bay Company in 1870 and suppressing Metis resistance to eastern intervention with armed force that included the use of the Gatling gun in 1885. Conditions were best suited for the growing of wheat but a naturally dry climate and a short growing season as well as low grain prices made the 1890s difficult. However the difficulties were overcome. Reduced rail transportation costs which helped ease the burden of getting wheat to market and a rise in wheat prices served to encourage the development of the industry. In the 1870s and 1880s, ranching gained prominence as well in southern Saskatchewan and Alberta where dry and even drought-like conditions were eventually overcome after the introduction of irrigation in 1894.

The dairy industry with its associated techniques took root in Canada in the 1860s. The process for the factory production of cheese was developed by Jesse Williams in New York in 1851. The first Canadian cheese factory was built in Oxford County, Ontario in 1864 and was followed by a factory in Dunham, Quebec in 1865. By 1873, Canada was home to about 200 cheese factories. The first creamery of note was built at Helena, Quebec in 1873, while in 1883, the first Canadian producer of condensed milk began operation in Truro, Nova Scotia. The large scale home delivery of milk began in Toronto, Ottawa and Montreal in 1900.

=== Materials ===
Railway and locomotive construction in the latter 19th century created a huge demand for steel.

Portland cement was imported from England to Canada in barrels during the 19th century complementing the modest production of hydraulic cement that began in Hull, Quebec in 1830. By 1889 there were noted increases in the output of cement in Hull and other cement factories were built in Montreal, Napanee and Shallow Lake Ontario and in Vancouver in 1893.

The industrial use of asbestos became notable during these years. Asbestos was discovered and mined in a number of places around the world, including Thetford Mines, Quebec beginning in 1879 and found its way into a bewildering variety of products including, insulation, automobile brake-pads, siding, shingles and fireproofing. At the turn of the 20th century, a number of asbestos related health concerns were identified.

The pulp and paper industry also developed during these years. The sulfite pulp process developed in the US in 1866 became the basis for the Canadian industry. The first sulfite pulp mill in Canada, the Halifax Wood Fibre Company, was established in Sheet Harbour, Nova Scotia in 1885. Others followed including plants in Cornwall, Ontario, 1888, Hull, Quebec, 1889, Chatham, Quebec, 1889, the biggest, the Riordon Company in Merritton, Ontario in 1890 and in Hawkesbury, Ontario in 1898.

The first plastics became available during this period. The distillation of products from wood characterized the transition from the use of natural chemical products (chemical industry) to that of fully synthetic products. The Rathburn Company of Toronto began to produce distillates including, wood alcohol and calcium acetate, used to make acetic acid or acetone, in 1897. The Standard Chemical Company of Toronto established in 1897, initiated the production of acetic acid in 1899 and formaldehyde, from the oxidation of wood alcohol, in 1909. This later product was an essential element in the production of the fully synthetic, phenol-formaldehyde plastic (Bakelite).

=== Light manufacturing ===
The Bell Telephone Company of Canada established a manufacturing department to meet some of its equipment needs when it began to offer telephone service in 1882. In 1895, the operation became a separate company known as Northern Electric and Manufacturing Co. Ltd., which was in turn merged with Imperial Wire and Cable Co. in 1914 to form Northern Electric Co. By the twenties the company was manufacturing a variety of electrical products, with much of the telephone equipment being produced under licence from AT&T in the US. All equipment was based on analog technology.

The very popular and practical tin can was introduced during this period. In the 1880s, George Dunning built Canada's first canning factory in Prince Edward County, Ontario, for the canning of fruits and vegetables. By 1900 there were eight such factories in Canada, four of which were in that same county and within a few years canning factories were found all across the country. In the forties, high-temperature canning, which sterilized the contents of the can and permitted long-term storage, was introduced.

The cigarette began to make its mark during these years. D. Ritchie and Co. began to manufacture the Derby brand in a factory on Dalhousie Street in Montreal in the late 19th century. About the same time the American Cigarette Company also of Montreal began to produce cigarettes in a factory on Côté Street. In 1895, the American Tobacco Company, a US owned organization, acquired both of these operations, which were then spun off to a newly formed Canadian subsidiary, the American Tobacco Co. of Canada Ltd., which produced the popular Sweet Caporal brand.

With the coming of the railways and the introduction of Standard Time, a market for clocks developed in Canada. The Canadian Clock Company (Whitby, 1872) and the Hamilton Clock Company (Hamilton, 1876) were the first in Canada to manufacture these new devices. The Singer Manufacturing Company, established in 1851 in the US, began manufacturing its very popular line of sewing machines for the Canadian market at a factory built in St. Jean, Quebec in 1882.

Industrial textile production became important at this time. Large powered automatic looms were able to produce vast quantities of fabric. The most notable Canadian venture in this field was Dominion Textile. The company had its roots in the formation of the Dominion Cotton Mills Company in Montreal in 1880 from eight small inefficient mills.

=== Public works and civil engineering ===
Notable works of civil engineering realized during these years included: the Lakehead Terminal Grain Elevators, 1882, the Naden First Graving Dock, Esquimalt, British Columbia, 1887, the St. Clair Railway Tunnel, Sarnia, Ontario, 1890, the Whirlpool Rapids Bridge, Niagara Falls, 1897 and the Alexandra Bridge, Ottawa, Ontario – Hull, Quebec, 1900.

Baseball in Canada received its first permanent home with the construction in 1877 of Tecumseh Park, built in London, Ontario for the London Tecumsehs baseball team. Other fields followed including Sunlight Park, in Toronto, 1886, Atwater Park, Montreal, in 1890 and Hanlan's Point Ball Field, 1897, in Toronto home of the Maple Leafs.

The steam shovel became an essential item of construction equipment during these years. Invented by William Otis in 1839, it was used widely in Canada, for the excavation of railway right-of-ways and the digging of basements and foundations for skyscrapers and domestic housing, in the late 19th century.

=== Waste disposal (sewers) ===
Sewerage systems were built in substantial numbers, but were not as common as water supply systems. Some of the first included Vancouver, B.C. in 1886 and Charlottetown, PEI in 1898. While the systems collected sewage and liquid waste from homes, public and commercial buildings and industrial sites, in most cases they merely displaced the problem for they emptied their contents into a nearby river or lake (or in the case of coastal cities, the ocean), without treatment.

The disposal of solid waste became a considerable problem as towns and cities grew. By the mid-19th century, a number of Canadian municipalities used horse-drawn wagons for curbside garbage collection. The refuse was usually taken to a field or dump or in some instances piled along the bank of a nearby river or lake. With the arrival of motor power, the use of the garbage truck became common although the method of disposing of the garbage remained the same.

The introduction of the flush toilet in the US and Canada in the 1880s created a market that inspired the invention of rolled toilet paper. The product was first produced in the US by the Albany Perforated Wrapping Paper Company in 1877.

=== Skyscrapers and architecture ===
It was the age of the skyscraper. The first in Canada was the eight-storey New York Life Insurance Co Building in Montreal, 1887–1889, although it did not have a steel frame. The first self-supporting steel framed skyscraper in Canada was the Robert Simpson Department Store at the corner of Yonge and Queen in Toronto with its six floors and electric elevators, built in 1895.

A number of grand hotels also opened during these years, including the Banff Springs Hotel, Banff, Alberta, 1888, the Algonquin, St. Andrews, New Brunswick, 1889, the Chateau Frontenac, Quebec, City, 1893, the Queen's, Montreal, 1893, the "new" Chateau Lake Louise, Lake Louise, Alberta, 1894, and the Manoir Richelieu, Point-au-Pic, Quebec, 1899.

Church architecture and construction was also notable as seen in the completion of Mary, Queen of the World Cathedral, a half scale replica of St. Paul's Cathedral in Rome, in Montreal in 1894.

=== Central heating ===
The construction of skyscrapers, grand hotels and other large buildings led to the development of central heating, an essential feature in Canada's cold climate. Up to that time large buildings and homes were heated with fireplaces and iron stoves that used wood or coal as fuel. The construction of large multi-story buildings made this impractical. Fireplaces and stoves on the lower floors would have long flues and would not draw properly. On the upper floors, it would be necessary to transport fuel and to remove ashes up and down many flights of stairs or with an elevator. Central heating solved these problems. In 1832, British inventor Angier March Perkins developed a steam heating system for domestic use. This inspired the use of closed circuit hot water systems for large buildings. A metal furnace in the basement burning wood or coal was used to heat water in a tank, which in turn was circulated by an electric pump through a system of iron pipes throughout the building to radiators in rooms where heat was lost to the ambient air. The cooler water then returned to the water heater with the help of gravity, where it was reheated and recirculated.

=== Defence ===
In 1885, the newly introduced Gatling gun was first used by Canadian troops during the Riel Rebellion. The 12-pound field gun was used by Canadian soldiers in the Boer War. To provide the Canadian Militia with a source of Canadian manufactured munitions, the government established the crown-operated Dominion Arsenal in Quebec City in 1882. This factory produced bullets and shells.

A reflection of this intense engineering activity as described above is seen in the founding of the Canadian Society for Civil Engineering in 1887.

== End note ==
In the earlier parts of Canada's history, the state often played a crucial role in the diffusion of these technologies, in some cases through a monopoly enterprise, in others with a private "partner". In more recent times, the need for the role of the state has diminished in the presence of a larger private sector.

In the latter part of the 20th century, there is evidence that Canadian values prefer public expenditures on social programmes at the expense of public spending on the maintenance and expansion of public technical infrastructure. This can be seen in the fact that in 2008, the Federation of Canadian Municipalities estimated that it would take $123 billion to restore and repair aging urban infrastructure across Canada.

== See also ==
- Artificial intelligence industry in Canada
- Canadian government scientific research organizations
- Canadian industrial research and development organizations
- Canadian inventions
- Canadian Mining Hall of Fame
- Canadian scientists
- Canadian space program
- Canadian university scientific research organizations
- CP Ships
- Economic history of Canada
- Energy policy of Canada
- History of the petroleum industry in Canada
- Internet in Canada
- List of aircraft of the Canadian Air Force
- List of airlines of Canada
- List of airports in Canada
- List of bridges in Canada
- List of Canadian Navy ships
- List of infantry weapons and equipment of the Canadian military
- List of reservoirs and dams in Canada
- Nuclear power in Canada
- Science and technology in Canada
- Scientific research in Canada
