= Science and technology in Canada =

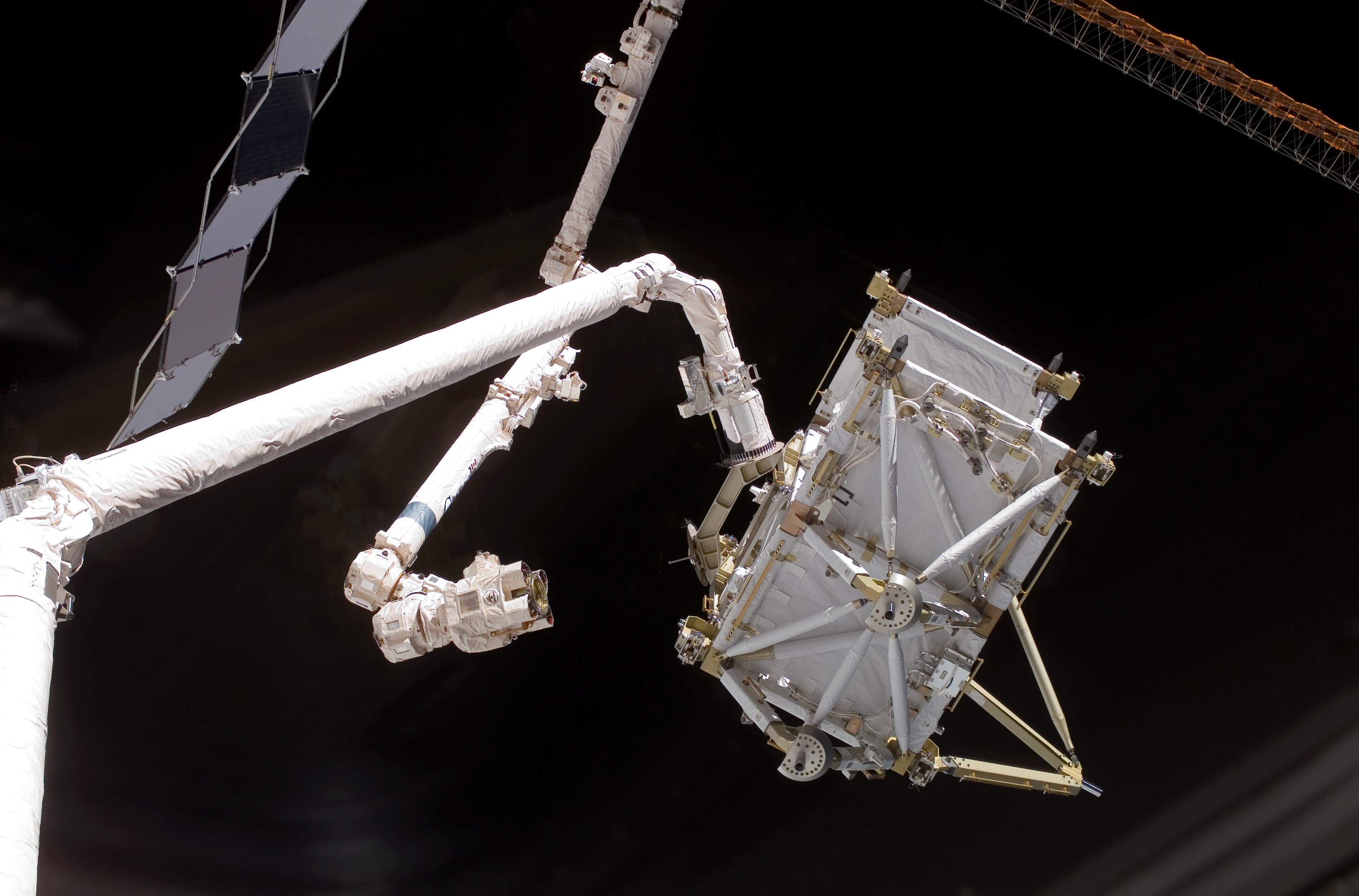
The Canadian-built Space Shuttle robotic arm (left), known as Canadarm, transferred the P5 truss segment over to the Canadian-built space station robotic arm, known as Canadarm2.

In 2019, Canada spent approximately CA$40.3 billion on domestic research and development, of which over $7 billion was provided by the federal and provincial governments. In 2018, Canada spent approximately C$34.5 billion on domestic research and development, of which around $2 billion was spent directly by the federal government in-house and an additional $5.7 billion was provided by provincial and federal sources in the form of grants. This investment corresponds to about 1.57% of Canada's gross domestic product, a decline from 1.72% in 2014. In 2025, Canada was ranked 17th in the Global Innovation Index by the World Intellectual Property Organization, and stepped ahead to the 16th position in 2026.

As of 2020, the country has produced fifteen Nobel laureates in physics, chemistry, and medicine, and was ranked fourth worldwide for scientific research quality in a major 2012 survey of international scientists. It is furthermore home to the headquarters of a number of global technology firms. Canada has one of the highest levels of Internet access in the world, with over 33 million users, equivalent to around 94 percent of its total 2014 population.

Some of the most notable scientific developments in Canada include the creation of the modern alkaline battery and the polio vaccine and discoveries about the interior structure of the atomic nucleus. Other major Canadian scientific contributions include the artificial cardiac pacemaker, mapping the visual cortex, the development of the electron microscope, plate tectonics, deep learning, multi-touch technology and the identification of the first black hole, Cygnus X-1. Canada has a long history of discovery in genetics, which include stem cells, site-directed mutagenesis, T-cell receptor and the identification of the genes that cause Fanconi anemia, cystic fibrosis and early-onset Alzheimer's disease, among numerous other diseases.

The Canadian Space Agency operates a highly active space program, conducting deep-space, planetary, and aviation research, and developing rockets and satellites. Canada was the third country to design and construct a satellite after the Soviet Union and the United States, with the 1962 Alouette 1 launch. Canada is a participant in the International Space Station (ISS), and is a pioneer in space robotics, having constructed the Canadarm, Canadarm2 and Dextre robotic manipulators for the ISS and NASA's Space Shuttle. Since the 1960s, Canada's aerospace industry has designed and built numerous marques of satellite, including Radarsat-1 and 2, ISIS and MOST. Canada has also produced one of the world's most successful and widely used sounding rockets, the Black Brant; over 1,000 Black Brants have been launched since the rocket's introduction in 1961.

== The diffusion of technology in Canada ==
The technological and industrial history of Canada encompasses the country's development in the areas of transportation, communication, energy, materials, public works, public services (health care), domestic/consumer and defense technologies. Most technologies diffused in Canada came from other places; only a small number actually originated in Canada. For more about those with a Canadian origin, see Invention in Canada.

The terms chosen for the "age" described below are both literal and metaphorical. They describe the technology that dominated the period in question but are also representative of a large number of other technologies introduced during the same period. Also of note is the fact that the period of diffusion of a technology can begin modestly and can extend well beyond the "age" of its introduction. To maintain continuity, the treatment of its diffusion is dealt with in the context of its dominant "age". For example, the "Steam Age" here is defined as being from 1840 to 1880. However, steam-powered boats were introduced in 1809, the CPR was completed in 1885 and railway construction in Canada continued well into the 20th century. To preserve continuity, the development of steam, in the early and later years, is therefore considered within the "Steam Age".

Technology is a major cultural determinant, no less important in shaping human lives than philosophy, religion, social organization, or political systems. In the broadest sense, these forces are also aspects of technology. The French sociologist Jacques Ellul defined "la technique" as the totality of all rational methods in every field of human activity so that, for example, education, law, sports, propaganda, and the social sciences are all technologies in that sense. At the other end of the scale, common parlance limits the term's meaning to specific industrial arts.

== See also ==
- Artificial intelligence industry in Canada
- List of Canadian inventions, innovations, and discoveries
- Canadian government scientific research organizations
- Canadian university scientific research organizations
- Canadian industrial research and development organizations
- Canadian scientists
- Canadian inventions
- Canadian space program
- Canada Institute for Scientific and Technical Information
- U15 - research-intensive universities
- Natural scientific research in Canada
- National Research Council (Canada)
- Nuclear power in Canada
- Open access in Canada
- Petroleum production in Canada
- Electricity sector in Canada
- Economic history of Canada
- The U.N. Educational, Scientific and Cultural Organization (UNESCO)
