= Invention in Canada =

This article outlines the history of Canadian technological invention. Technologies chosen for treatment here include, in rough order, transportation, communication, energy, materials, industry, public works, public services (health care), domestic/consumer and defence technologies.

The terms chosen for the "age" described below are both literal and metaphorical. They describe the technology that dominated the period of time in question but are also representative of a large number of other technologies introduced during the same period. Also of note is the fact that the period of invention of a technology can begin modestly and can extend well beyond the "age" of its introduction. To maintain continuity, the complete treatment of an invention is dealt with in the context of its dominant "age".

== Stone Age (14,000 BC – AD 1600) ==
The first innovators and inventors in Canada were the native peoples who arrived 14,000 years ago. They innovated techniques to survive in a very new and mostly hostile environment. This involved new ways to obtain food, create clothing and travel across a huge territory. Notable inventions included the canoe, snowshoe, igloo and pemmican. The West Coast natives innovated construction techniques that included the use of heavy timber and eastern tribes developed sedentary agricultural techniques.

== Age of Sail (1600–1830) ==
The arrival of the Europeans provided a new impetus for innovation and invention.

The first metal works, Les Forges de St. Maurice, developed metal products for colonial use. Along with the Royal Dockyards of 1666 and 1746 in Quebec City, they constituted the first groups of skilled industrial labourers working in teams to solve the problems related to the construction of complex structures.

Techniques to improve fishing and the cutting and the transport of timber were refined. There were innovations in cultivation techniques to deal with the cold climate.

== Steam Age (1830–1880) ==
This era ushered in experimentation with the design of steam powered locomotives and ships.

It was via the paddle-powered steam boat that steam power was first introduced to Canada. The Accommodation, a side-wheeler built entirely in Montreal by the Eagle Foundry and launched in 1809, was the first steamer to ply Canadian waters, making its maiden voyage from Montreal to Quebec that same year in 36 hours.

The building of large wooden ocean-going sailing vessels became a hugely successful undertaking in the Maritimes in the latter half of the nineteenth century due to innovative construction techniques and designs.

Sandford Fleming invented standard time.

In 1844, in Nova Scotia, Charles Fenerty invented newsprint made from woodpulp and Abraham Gesner invented kerosene in Halifax in 1846.

Thomas Willson innovated techniques for the production of acetylene. Experiments in X-ray technology were conducted at RMC in Kingston, Ontario. Henry Ruttan improved techniques for the heating and ventilation of buildings and railway cars. In the United States, Canadian James Lee invented the rifle magazine.

== Electric Age (1880–1920) ==
Matthew Evans and Henry Woodward invented and patented the incandescent electric light in Toronto in 1874 and later sold the patent to Edison. This would become the basis for his renowned endeavours with electric lighting. Thomas Willson invented the electric arc light during this period.

The year 1876 saw Alexander Graham Bell invent the telephone. Bell (a Scot by birth) had a family home in Canada at the time, but conducted much of his work in a rented laboratory in Boston. Experiments in trans-oceanic wireless communication were being conducted by Guglielmo Marconi in Newfoundland and Cape Breton. In the US, Canadian Reginald Fessenden conducted investigations into what is now called FM broadcasting. Canadian Frederick Creed invented the teleprinter in 1902.

As stated on its Wikipedia page, "Brantford [Ontario] is sometimes known by the nickname "The Telephone City" as former city resident Alexander Graham Bell conducted the first distant telephone call from the community to Paris, Ontario in 1876."

Charles C. Barnes of Sackville, New Brunswick invented the rotary vane pump and patented the device on June 16, 1874.

Inventive Canadian chemists specializing in the field of electrochemistry during this period included W.T. Gibbs, T.L. Wilson and E.A. LeSeur.

In 1907, the invention by researcher Charles E. Saunders of genetically modified Marquis wheat with its hardy growing characteristics helped overcome retarded growing conditions on the prairies.

Alexander Graham Bell undertook experiments in aviation and high-speed water craft on Bras d'Ors Lakes in Nova Scotia. It was here that Canada's first heavier-than-air machine, the AEA Silver Dart, took to the air in 1909.

Peter Robertson invented the square-headed Robertson screwdriver in Milton, Ontario, in 1908.

== Military and defence I (1914–1918) ==
WWI invention and innovations included the variable-pitch propeller, developed by Wallace Rupert Turnbull, the gas mask, invented by Cluny MacPherson of the Royal Newfoundland Regiment, the "Nissen Hut", invented by Peter Norman Nissen in 1916, the Curtiss Canada bomber and the ill-starred Ross rifle. Attempts were made to convert the latter to what became known as the Huot automatic rifle, but the war ended before it could be introduced.

== Automobile Age (1920–1950) ==
In the early twentieth century, several dozen individuals and small businesses located mostly in southern Ontario experimented with snowblower innovation. One of these, Samuel McLaughlin of Oshawa, eventually became the basis for General Motors of Canada. S. L. C. Coleman of Fredericton, New Brunswick invented the sway bar, a device to improve the suspension of automobiles, in 1919. The dump truck was invented in Saint John, New Brunswick in 1920 by Robert T. Mawhinney. In Montreal Alexis Nihon invented the tubeless tire.

It was within this context that Joseph Bombardier in Quebec invented his automobile for the snow, or "snowmobile", and founded the Bombardier company. This corporation would become a giant of Canadian industrial research in the latter part of the century. In 1925, Arthur Sicard of Sainte-Thérèse, Quebec, invented the snow blower.

Experiments with electrical sound recording by microphone were undertaken by Horace Owen (born Hamilton, Ontario, 1888 died Ottawa 1972) and Lionel Guest in 1919.

This period also saw the development of the "batteryless" radio in Toronto by Edward S. Rogers, Sr. and further innovations in radio by Canadian Marconi Company in Montreal. Experiments in television transmission were conducted there by Alphonse Ouimet in Montreal in 1932. In 1937, Donald Hings invented what would become the Walkie-talkie.

On the domestic scene, Herbert McCool invented Easy-Off Oven Cleaner in Regina in 1932 and Frederick F. Tisdall, M.D., T. G. H. Drake, M.B., Pearl Summerfeldt, M.B., and Alan Brown, M.B. of the Hospital for Sick Children in Toronto, invented pablum in 1930.

Eli Franklin Burton along with students James Hillier, Cecil Hall and Albert Prebus invented the electron microscope at the University of Toronto in 1938 and Hugh Le Caine invented the music synthesizer in 1945. The 1940s also saw Frank Forward invent techniques for refining nickel and cobalt.

However, in terms of scale, nothing could match the giant of Canadian innovation throughout the late 19th and first half of the 20th century, the Canadian Pacific Angus Locomotive Works of Montreal. This huge enterprise designed, developed and built many of the steam engines for the great Canadian Pacific Railway Company.

== Military and defence II (1939–1945) ==
World War II saw science and industry harnessed to fight the enemy. The National Research Council (NRC), created during World War I to advise the government on industrial research, grew exponentially as did Canadian war industries. A tight bond was formed between the two.

The NRC itself helped develop radar, the proximity fuse, the explosive RDX, high-velocity artillery, fire control computers and submarine detection equipment, among other things. The NRC Examination Unit innovated in the field of cryptology. The NRC's Atomic Energy Project ushered in the Atomic Age with the development of the world's most powerful research reactor (NRX), as well as the start-up of the first reactor outside the United States (ZEEP), at its Chalk River Nuclear Laboratories (see below).

The Crown Corporation, Turbo Research (Orenda), a top-secret jet engine development enterprise, was established in 1944 at Leaside, near Toronto to develop jet power plants, including the TR.1, TR.2, TR.3, and TR.5, for RCAF aircraft.

Enterprises such as the Ford Motor Company of Canada developed and built special-purpose military transport vehicles. Polymer Corporation of Sarnia, Ontario pioneered new types of synthetic rubber. Canadian Industries Limited in Montreal formulated new types of explosive and Canadian Marconi Company innovated in the new field of radar. Northern Telecom (Nortel) developed telecommunications equipment. Ship building companies on the east and west coast adapted US and British designs and construction techniques for the mass construction of ships. Wilbur R. Franks invented the aviation anti-blackout suit in Toronto and experiments in germ and chemical warfare were conducted at Grosse-Isle, Quebec and what is now CFB Suffield, Alberta.

Specialized government businesses such as Research Enterprises Limited (1940), along with electronics firms like National Electric Company (NEC), developed and manufactured what would now be called "high tech" products, including optical systems and communications devices.

Secret arrangements with Britain and the US, resulting from the Tizard Mission, saw Canadian industry participate in the development of the atomic bomb, notably through the innovation of uranium refining techniques. Under the aegis of the National Research Council, a top-secret nuclear laboratory was established at the University of Montreal in 1942. Subsequently, the top-secret Chalk River Laboratories nuclear research facility was built at Chalk River, Ontario, and it was here that the ZEEP atomic pile went critical in 1945, making Canada the second country in the world after the US to build a nuclear reactor.

== Television Age (1950–1980) ==
After the war, a number of innovators, including Electrohome of Kitchener, Ontario, offered televisions and entertainment systems to consumers. In the 1950s, Anthony Barringer invented INPUT, an electromagnetic device used for the aerial detection of mineral deposits.

The Toronto area saw the creation of a nascent military industrial complex around the design of jet aircraft. AVRO Canada developed the Avro Canada Jetliner and the CF-100 jet fighter. The Orenda (Orenda Aerospace) jet engine factory developed jet power plants for the new aircraft. The scale of this undertaking grew dramatically with the development of the huge CF-105 long range high altitude interceptor and its associated Velvet Glove air-to-air missile and came crashing to the ground just as quickly when the project was cancelled in 1959. At the same time, with financing from the US, AVRO was developing the Avro Arrow Avrocar, a supersonic fighter based on a flying saucer design. However the project collapsed when the costs became unreasonably high.

East coast shipbuilders continued to innovate with the construction of new classes of warship such as the St. Laurent and Restigouche-class destroyers. The Royal Canadian Navy developed the innovative HMCS Bras d'Or but the vessel was not introduced into service. In Ottawa, the Defence Research Board, with the support of industry developed Canada's first satellites the Alouette 1 and Alouette 2, as well as the Black Brant (rocket). In the sixties and seventies, Gerald Bull experimented with long range artillery. Agent Orange (the herbicide) was tested by the US Army at Gagetown New Brunswick from the early fifties to the nineties.

There were also developments in civil aviation. In the 1950s, De Havilland Canada developed bush planes and later in the 1960s and 1970s STOL aircraft. CAE innovated in the field of aircraft simulators, and Pratt and Whitney Canada developed its signature PT-6 series of aircraft engines. Telesat Canada pioneered the development of the domestic Anik (satellite) series of spacecraft for communications. In the field of nuclear energy, Atomic Energy of Canada Limited developed its CANDU series of atomic power reactors.

Canola was developed in Canada from rapeseed during the 1970s by Keith Downey and Baldur Stefansson and is used to produce oil that is low in erucic acid and glucosinolate. It has become a major cash crop in North America. A strain of canola with additional modification that made it resistant to herbicide was introduced in Canada in 1996.

John Hopps invented the artificial pacemaker for heart patients, in Toronto in 1951, and Harold Elford Johns t Laboratories in Toronto innovated techniques for the mass production of the Salk vaccine. Nordion developed medical radio isotopes.

Gerald Heffernan invented what is known as mini-mill steel manufacturing. In the US, Canadian Lewis Urry working for the Eveready Company invented the alkaline battery and lithium battery. Also in the US, Canadian Willard Boyle working at the Bell Labs invented the charge-coupled device (CCD) which became the key technology for digital photography and improved astronomical telescopes.

Innovations in the pulp and paper industry have been made by the Forest Engineering Research Institute of Canada and the Pulp and Paper Research Institute of Canada, both located in Pointe-Claire, Quebec, Canada.

== PC Age (1980–2000) ==
The latter part of the twentieth century has been notable for developments in information technology, telecommunications and pharmaceuticals.

Canadian companies were early innovators in the PC field with models like the Hyperion. AES developed the word processor. The federal government became involved with its Telidon video text service based on the (North American Presentation Level Protocol Syntax) NAPLPS standard. Chip makers, such as ATI Technologies, developed powerful video cards for computer games. Business intelligence, and cinematic special effects software products developed by companies like Alias Research (Alias Systems Corporation) of Toronto formed in 1983, have enjoyed great success, as have a number of consumer oriented offerings including Corel Draw, software by Delrina Corporation of Toronto and many electronic games.

Northern Electric maintained its innovative pace, becoming Northern Telecom, and through part ownership in Bell-Northern Research became a leader in the development of digital switching and other communications technologies.

Pharmaceutical companies such as Pfizer Canada Inc., GlaxoSmithKline Inc., Merck Frosst Canada Ltd., Biovail Corporation, AstraZeneca Canada Inc. and Sanofi Pasteur invested hundred of millions in drug research.

Space research and development produced the Canadarm and Canadarm2 for the Space Shuttle and the International Space Station respectively, and RADARSAT-1 and RADARSAT-2. The NRC and Hughes developed and build MSAT, the mobile communications satellite in 1995.

Canadians have also invented the IMAX cinema and improved deep diving suits, such as the Newtsuit developed in 1987 by Phil Nuytten. Ballard Power Systems in Vancouver has produced a number of innovations in fuel cell technology. Michael Brook invented the "Infinite Guitar" in 1987.

Military innovations have included the Halifax-class frigate, LAV III light armoured vehicle, Air Defense Anti-Tank System, the CRV-7 rocket and secure communications systems. The US Air Force tested cruise missiles in western Canada in the eighties.

== Internet Age (2000–present) ==
In the early 2000s, the company BlackBerry Ltd, formally Research in Motion, which is based in Waterloo, Ontario, became a leader in smartphone technology with the introduction of BlackBerry brand of smartphones and tablets. Throughout the 2000s, competing smartphones were introduced which decreased BlackBerry's market share. In 2013, the company's share in the US personal consumer market was reduced to 3.8%. In 2001, the Faculty of Engineering at the University of Sherbrooke created the Adaptive Multi-Rate Wideband (AMR-WB) speech compression algorithm. This technique has become the basis for the world standard in cell phone voice quality.

The first web search programme, "Archie" (Archie search engine) was developed by Alan Emtage a student at McGill University in 1990. Early in the 21st century the internet reached its stride and contributed significantly to Canadian industrial research efforts through its use in the formation of networks such as CANARIE. Industrial software makers including Cognos and Open Text Corporation have had continued success in the field of business intelligence software and enterprise content management software, respectively. In 2007, D-Wave Systems a company located in Burnaby, British Columbia demonstrated the Orion, which it claims to be the world's first quantum computer. There are studies in quantum computing technology at the Institute for Quantum Computing, in Waterloo, Ontario.

In the field of pharmaceuticals and biotechnology, companies such as Apotex and Winnipeg based Cangene Corp., have become world leaders in the development of generic drugs and biopharmaceuticals respectively.

In 2008, AECL introduced the Advanced CANDU Reactor (ACR-1000) atomic power reactor and Nordion the develop the unsuccessful Multipurpose Applied Physics Lattice Experiment (MAPLE) atomic reactor, intended for the production of medical isotopes. This cancellation was one of the factors leading to a shortage of medical isotopes in 2007 and 2009.

The beginning of the 21st century is also notable for the rise of research in the field of nanotechnology. About 140 small to medium-sized firms based in Vancouver, Calgary, Toronto, Ottawa and Montreal are researching products in this field, some privately funded and others supported by the National Institute for Nanotechnology in Edmonton.

In 2008, the Zenn (zero emission no noise) light electric car, manufactured at Saint-Jerome, Quebec and the Nemo light electric truck built at Sainte-Therese, Quebec, were introduced to the Canadian and international market.

Since 1998, the Mars Society has experimented with procedures related to the establishment of human life on Mars at its simulated base located at Haughton Lake on Devon Island. In 2008, Odyssey Moon, based on the Isle of Man announced plans to build the Moon I (M-1) space craft with MacDonald Detwiller and Associated Ltd. of Richmond BC, as prime contractor, as a competitor in the Google Lunar X Prize Challenge.

Military research in Canada has been championed by Defence Research and Development Canada, created in 2000 as the result of the reorganization of the Defence Research Board of Canada.

The government of Canada has put into place tax programmes to encourage industrial R&D. Today, industrial research accounts for about 50% of all research spending in Canada.

== See also ==
- Canada Research Chair
- Canadian beer
- Canadian government scientific research organizations
- Canadian industrial research and development organizations
- Canadian inventions
- Canadian Mining Hall of Fame
- Canadian scientists
- Canadian space program
- Canadian university scientific research organizations
- CP Ships
- Digital television in Canada
- Economic history of Canada
- Energy policy of Canada
- Group of Thirteen (Canadian universities)
- History of the petroleum industry in Canada
- Internet in Canada
- List of aircraft of the Canadian Air Force
- List of airlines of Canada
- List of airports in Canada
- List of botanical gardens in Canada
- List of bridges in Canada
- List of Canadian Navy ships
- List of CAZA member zoos and aquariums
- List of reservoirs and dams in Canada
- Nuclear power in Canada
- Science and technology in Canada
- Television in Canada
- Timeline of the Canadian Broadcasting Corporation
