= Economic history of Canada =

History of the Canadian economy

The history of Canada and the Canadian economy traces back to the hunter-gather trade networks of Indigenous people in Canada. Furs, tools, decorative items, and other goods were often transported thousands of kilometres, mostly by canoe throughout the many rivers and lakes of the region. After European colonization, fisheries became the first major economic export in the region, followed by fur trade, and eventually mercantilism. Economic integration spread across the country with Western expansion, linking ten provinces and territories.

1942 pictorial map of Canada, representing its natural wealth and resources.

Studies of economic history in Canada is highly focused on economic geography, and for many years the dominant school of thought has been the staples thesis. This school of thought bases the study of the Canadian economy on the study of natural resources.

== Fishing in Canada ==
=== Atlantic Fisheries ===
The earliest European settlements in Canada were the fisheries of the East Coast, especially the Grand Banks off Newfoundland. Boats from France, Portugal, Spain, and Great Britain would traverse the Atlantic, fish for a summer and then return laden with fish. The trade was originally dominated by fishers from southern Europe. In Catholic countries, demand for fish was much greater. It was from the northern nations of Britain and France that the first settlers came, however. Spain, Portugal and the south of France had abundant supplies of salt because in the warm climates it was a simple matter to evaporate seawater. They would thus bring barrels of salt with them to the fishing grounds, salt the fish aboard ship, and return to Europe never having touched land. In the colder and wetter climate of the British Isles and northern France, salt was in scarce supply. To preserve the fish, they were dried by hanging them on large fish racks on the coast of Newfoundland and Nova Scotia. These drying stations were active for months of the year, and eventually permanent settlements grew up around them. These small settlements totaled only a few thousand people, but they were many of the first European arrivals in North America

=== Pacific Fisheries ===
Prior to European contact, First Nations people on the Pacific Coast would frequently trade salmon with First Nations people of the Canadian Prairies. Shortly after European settlements had begun appearing in British Columbia in the mid 19th century, the first salmon canneries had begun appearing alongside them, the first being a salmon cannery in the Fraser river in 1867. The next forty years saw the salmon industry gradually become an increasingly lucrative trade in the pacific. Places such as the Fraser river and the Skeena river saw a sharp rise in immigration and the development of the fishing industry. With the outbreak of the Second World War came an increased demand for fishing industries of British Columbia to help relieve the war effort. The ten-year average for total cases of canned salmon in British Columbia from 1910 to 1942 was 1.6 million, while the Second World War's average alone was more than 2 million, with a peak of 2.25 million in 1942.

== Mercantilism and corporatism ==
Canada's economic development in colonial times was based on the economic policy of mercantilism. This economic idea sought to derive the maximum material benefit from the colony, for the homeland, with a minimum of imperial investment in the colony itself. The ideology was embodied in New France through the establishment under Royal Charter of a number of corporate trading monopolies including La Compagnie des Marchands, which operated from 1613 to 1621 and the Compagnie de Montmorency, from that date until 1627. It was in turn replaced by La Compagnie des Cent-Associés created in 1627, by the King of France, Louis XIII and the Communauté des habitants in 1643. These were the first corporations to operate in what is now Canada.

== Staples thesis ==
Harold Innis (1894–1952), based in the history department at the University of Toronto, and William Archibald Mackintosh (1895–1970), based in the economics department at Queen's University developed the Staples thesis. They argued that the Canadian Economy (beyond the level of subsistence farming) was primarily based on exports of a series of staples—fish, fur, timber, wheat—that shipped to Britain and the British Empire. Industrialization came much later. The thesis explains Canadian economic development as a lateral, east–west conception of trade. Innis argued that Canada developed as it did because of the nature of its staple commodities: raw materials, such as fish, fur, lumber, agricultural products and minerals. This trading link cemented Canada's cultural links to Britain. The search for and exploitation of these staples led to the creation of institutions that defined the political culture of the nation and its regions. Innis, Influenced by the American historian Frederick Jackson Turner added a sociological dimension: different staples led to the emergence of regional economies (and societies) within Canada. For instance, the staple commodity in Atlantic Canada was cod fishing. This industry was very decentralized, but also very co-operative. In western Canada the central staple was wheat. Wheat farming was a very independent venture, which led to a history of distrust of government and corporations in that part of the country. (Also important, however, were the shocks caused by volatility in the market for wheat and by the weather itself on the growing season.) In Central Canada, the main staple was fur, and the fur trade dominated the economy for many years. This fur trade was controlled by large firms, such as the Hudson's Bay Company and thus produced the much more centralized, business-oriented society that today characterizes Montreal and Toronto.

=== Core-periphery model ===
Innis depicted the relationship between regions of Canada as one of "heartland" to "hinterland": The periphery, or hinterland, is dominated by the core, or heartland. Because the heartland was dependent upon the search for and accumulation of staples (which were located in the hinterland) to perpetuate the economy, it sought to gain economic and political power by exploiting the hinterland. Historians continue to use elements of the Innis model, applying it for example to British Columbia. That province's economic structure exemplifies the "core-periphery" structure of intra-regional relationships. The core is metropolitan Vancouver, with its concentration of corporate management and transportation functions and manufacturing growth. It dominates an underdeveloped periphery that depends on production and export of staple commodities.

== Fur trade ==
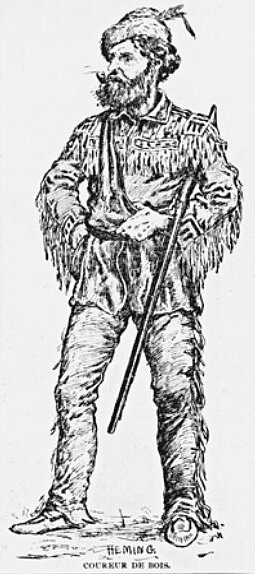
"Coureur de bois" – A woodcut by Arthur Heming

The fur trade was key to the development of the Canadian interior. In Europe, hats from beaver pelts had become especially fashionable and valuable, and the forests of North America were home to many of the creatures.

This trade closely involved the Native peoples who would hunt the beavers and other animals and then sell their pelts to Europeans in exchange for guns, textiles, and luxury items like mirrors and beads. Those who traded with the Native were the voyageurs, woodsmen who travelled the length of North America to bring pelts to the ports of Montreal and Quebec City.

The French dominated the trade through the New France, the Ohio Valley, and west into what would be Manitoba and Saskatchewan. In an attempt to break the French monopoly the English began trading through Hudson Bay and the Hudson's Bay Company built an elaborate network of trading posts and forts.

There was fierce rivalry between the French and English and their respective Native allies. Even when the two nations were at peace fierce fighting would occur in the interior.

The great disadvantage of the fur trade for the Canadians was that it did not encourage settlement. The fur trade only needed a few highly skilled workers. Also, the fur trade required more tonnage of goods to be shipped to North America than going the other way. This meant that there was no excess space on the westward voyage and passage costs were high. Unlike the United States where agriculture had become the primary industry, requiring a large labour force the population of what would be Canada remained very low.

This was a great benefit to the British in their struggles with the French. Over the course of the eighteenth century, the French possessions were gradually seized by the British until, in 1759, all of New France was conquered. The continued dependence on trade with Europe, also meant that the northern colonies were far more reluctant to join the American Revolution, and Canada thus remained loyal to the British crown.

== Population history ==
The population has grown steadily from a few thousand in the 1660s, to one million in the 1820s, 10 million in the 1920s, and 30 million in 2001. Accurate census data begins in 1851; the older numbers are estimates by historians.

Year	Population in thousands	Net growth rate	immigration
1668	4		
1685	10	5.4%	
1713	19	2.3%	
1763	65	2.5%	
1790	192	4.0%	
1806	473	5.6%	
1831	1,124	3.5%	
1851	2,436	3.9%	
1861	3,230	2.8%	152
1871	3,689	1.3%	−191
1881	4,325	1.6%	−87
1891	4,883	1.2%	−206
1901	5,371	1.0%	−180
1911	7,207	2.9%	716
1921	8,788	2.0%	351
1931	10,377	1.7%	229
1941	11,507	1.0%	−92
1951	14,009	2.0%	169
1961	18,238	2.6%	1081
1971	21,568	1.7%	724
1981	24,343	1.2%	853
1991	28,120	1.4%	
2001	30,007	0.6%	
2005	32,500	2.0%	

== Timber ==
In the early nineteenth century timber became the dominant staple commodity. Timber for the domestic market had long been a small industry in the colonies, but it was changes in Europe in the early nineteenth century that created a large export market. Great Britain had exhausted its supplies of quality timber by the start of the eighteenth century. The great oaks that had built the Royal Navy were all but gone. The lack of very large trees that could supply great masts was especially problematic as they were a necessity for both its war and merchant shipping. A thriving timber importing business had thus developed between Britain and the Baltic region. This trade was very unpopular for both economic and strategic reasons.

For much of the eighteenth century, Britain had encouraged the timber trade with the New England colonies. The American stands of timber were primarily located along the small, but easily navigable rivers of New York and Massachusetts. These were fairly quickly exhausted. Even without the American Revolution new sources would have been needed by the start of the nineteenth century.

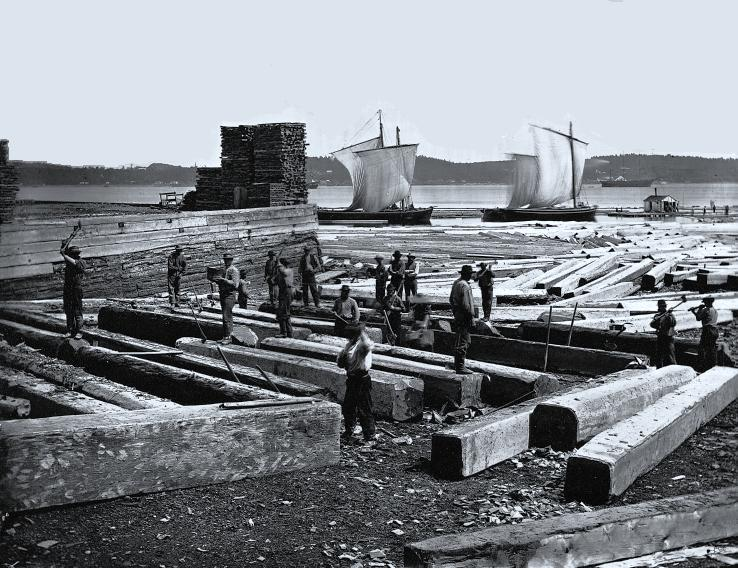
Butting square timber, Quebec City, QC, 1872.

The Napoleonic Wars and the Continental blockade cut off, or at least reduced the Baltic trade so the British looked northwards to the colonies that had remained loyal and were still available. The industry became concentrated in three main regions. The first to be exploited was the Saint John River system. Trees in the still almost deserted hinterland of New Brunswick were cut and transported to Saint John where they were shipped to England. This area soon could not keep up with demand and the trade moved to the St. Lawrence River where logs were shipped to Quebec City before being sent on to Europe. This area also proved insufficient and the trade expanded westward, most notably to the Ottawa River system, which, by 1845, provided three-quarters of the timber shipped from Quebec City. The timber trade became a massive business. In one summer, 1200 ships were loaded with timber at Quebec City alone, and it became by far British North America's most important commodity. it was from the money made in timber that the Bank of Montreal was founded in 1817.

The cutting of the timber was done by small groups of men in isolated camps. For most of the nineteenth century, the most common product was square timber, which was a log that had been cut into a square block in the forest before being shipped. The timber was transported from the hinterlands to the major markets by assembling it into a raft and floating it downstream. Because of the narrower and more turbulent waters that one would encounter on the Ottawa River system, smaller rafts, known as "cribs," were employed. On the St. Lawrence, however, very large rafts, some up a third of a mile in length would be employed. The most common type of tree harvested was white pine, mostly because it floated well. Oak, which does not float, was in high demand but was much harder to transport and oak timbers needed to be carefully integrated into the raft if they were to be carried to market.

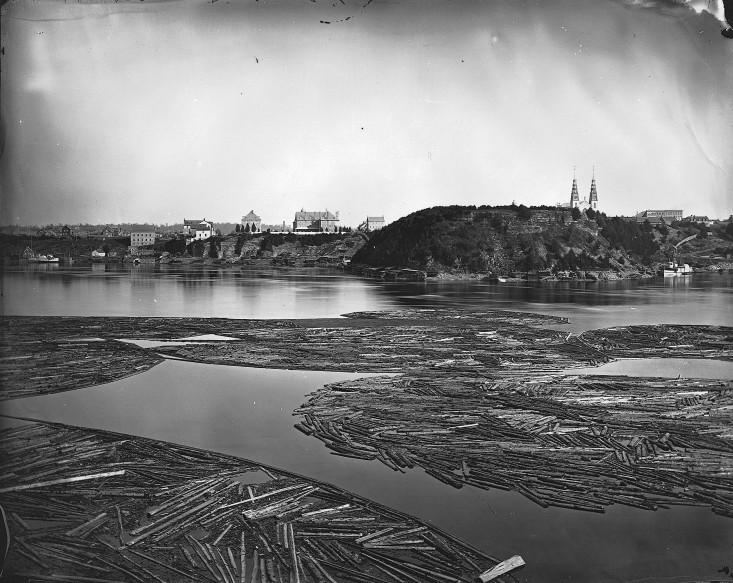
Timber booms on the Ottawa River, Canada, 1872.

In 1842, the British preferential tariffs were lifted; however, the transatlantic trade still remained a profitable one. Demand in Britain remained high, especially for railway ties. Improved ships and new technologies, especially the steam engine, allowed the trade to continue to prosper. After the middle of the century the trade in timber began to decline, being replaced by trade in cut lumber and the pulp and paper industry.

One of the most important side effects of the timber trade was immigration to British North America. Timber is a very bulky and not a particularly valuable cargo. For every ship full of British manufactured goods, dozens would be needed to carry the same value of timber. There was no cargo coming from the British Isles to Canada that could take up as much room on the return voyage. Exporting salt filled a few ships, and some vessels were even filled with bricks, but many timber ships made the westward voyage filled with ballast. The population of Canada was small and the lack of wealth in the area made it an unattractive market.

There was, however, one cargo that the ship-owners did not have to worry about finding a market for in the sparsely populated New World: people. Many of the timber ships turned to carrying immigrants for the return voyage from the British Isles to fill this unused capacity. Timber ships would unload their cargo and sell passage to those desiring to emigrate. During the early nineteenth century, with the preferential tariff in full effect, the timber ships were among the oldest and most dilapidated in the British merchant fleet, and travelling as a passenger upon them was extremely unpleasant and dangerous. It was, however, very cheap. Since timber exports would peak at the same time as conflicts in Europe, such as the Napoleonic Wars, a great mass of refugees sought this cheap passage across the Atlantic.

In later decades after the repeal of the tariff and the increase of competition, the quality and safety of the ships improved markedly. Since the travellers would bring along their own food and bedding the trade was an extremely easy one to operate. All that was required was a few advertisements, generally in Irish newspapers, and the installation of bunks along the side of the hold. An average timber ship could thus carry about 200 passengers. Even with only a fraction of the hundreds of timber ships carrying passengers, this created an unprecedented influx of new inhabitants. By comparison, it has been calculated that the trade between New France and Europe only included an average sixty-six immigrants per year over the lifetime of that colony.

The timber trade did not only bring immigrants to British North America, it also played a very important role in keeping them there as well. While many of those disembarking from the timber ships would head south to the United States, many others would stay in British North America. In large part, this was because of the employment that could be found in the timber trade. At the peak of the trade in the 1840s, 15,000 Irish loggers were employed in the Gatineau region alone. This when it had been only a few years before that the population of Montreal was only ten thousand. Similar situations could be found in the other centres of the timber trade.

=== Historiography ===
Historian Robert Gillis, has emphasized the strong interest of lumber men in long-term conservation of the natural resources they were harvesting. However he points out that most historians present a much more negative interpretation:

The prevailing attitude in Canadian historiography towards the lumber man is a mixture of maudlin romanticism and harsh, vitriolic condemnation. Along with most other businessmen the lumber operator is pictured as a crass, yet colourful, grasping individualist dedicated to the proposition of laissez faire. This approach, which might be called the 'robber baron' interpretation of the forest industry, was first adopted by A.R.M. Lower in The North American Assault on the Canadian Forest (1938). Lower stresses the instability and transitory nature of lumbering, condemns its wastefulness, praises the early efforts at conservation and by calling the lumber men 'buccaneers.'

=== Upper Canada ===
The timber industry also created large peripheral industries, the most important of these being agriculture. Unlike the fur trade, the timber trade saw large numbers of men in one location for a substantial period of time. The lumber camps, and the lumber towns needed to be supplied with food and other provisions. In the early years of the trade, much of the food, mostly barrels of pork, was shipped from the United States. Mostly coming from around the Cleveland area, shipping costs were high, creating a market for locally produced goods. As the loggers pushed ever westwards, farmers followed to take advantage of this captive market. Some of these farms failed after the loggers moved on, but many found new markets and became permanent settlements. This process formed the basis of many communities in what is now Ontario.

To encourage the settlement of the best land in the region, the government created the Canada Company. It was given much of the land in Western Ontario and Southwestern Ontario and tasked with selling it off to immigrants. It was successful in this, but it also became deeply unpopular for its monopolization of the land. This was an important trigger of the 1837 rebellions.

=== Farming in 1860s ===
The 1940 "Report" of the Rowell-Sirois Commission described the economy of rural Canada in 1867, when just under half the labor force was in farming:

The farm household in Upper Canada [Ontario] was still a basically self-sufficient unit. Food was grown and processed at home. The raw products of the farm were turned into articles of wear with the assistance of the local shoemaker and tailor who would take produce in return for their services. Such necessaries as tea, sugar, hardware and certain articles of clothing which could not be produced at home were generally obtained by barter from the local general store. Tallow was turned into candles, fatty refuse into soap, and the tools which were beyond the ingenuity of the farm workshop could generally be contrived by the local blacksmith. What was true of the Upper Canada farm was even more true of the agricultural communities in Lower Canada [Quebec] and the Maritimes, where such things as furniture, carts, and carriages were frequently made on the farm. The farm of the period was a miniature factory or combination of factories. Much of the work of the large industrial army of today, concentrated in highly specialized factories in the cities and towns was, in that early period, performed in a multitude of rural households. However prices might fall and cash income from other sources might melt away, the farm household always produced enough to prevent abject poverty. This fact had its importance for other industries as well. The farm was often a base of operations, on which individuals could fall back when other projects and occupations ended in disaster. In the Maritimes, agriculture, fishing and lumbering were closely allied. Everywhere the family and its relatives were a close economic unit; the various members helped one another when new enterprises were started or old ones failed. The material basis for this mutual welfare association was the family farm.

== Capitalism, banking and finance ==
Capitalism in the 19th century became the dominant philosophy for Canadian economic development. It evolved from the economic activity of the colonial business elite. One of the most important manifestations of this ideology was the creation of an indigenous financial system. One of Canada's first banks, the Canada Banking Company was founded in Montreal in 1792. This was followed by others including the Bank of Montreal, in 1817, the Bank of New Brunswick in 1820 and the Bank of Upper Canada in 1821. By 1886, 38 banks had been chartered. The pace of this financial activity was marked by the newly formed Government of Canada with the passing of the Bank Act in 1871. Insurance companies, including, Sun Life, 1865, Mutual Life, 1870, Confederation Life, 1871 and London Life, 1874, were also founded during these years. Markets for the exchange of investments came to Canada as well, with the establishment of the Montreal Stock Exchange in 1832, the Toronto Stock Exchange in 1861 and the Winnipeg Commodity Exchange in 1904. The repeal of the Corn Laws by the Parliament of Britain in 1846, terminated colonial trading preferences and marked the symbolic end of mercantilism in Canada while ushering in the new era of capitalism.

== Canals ==
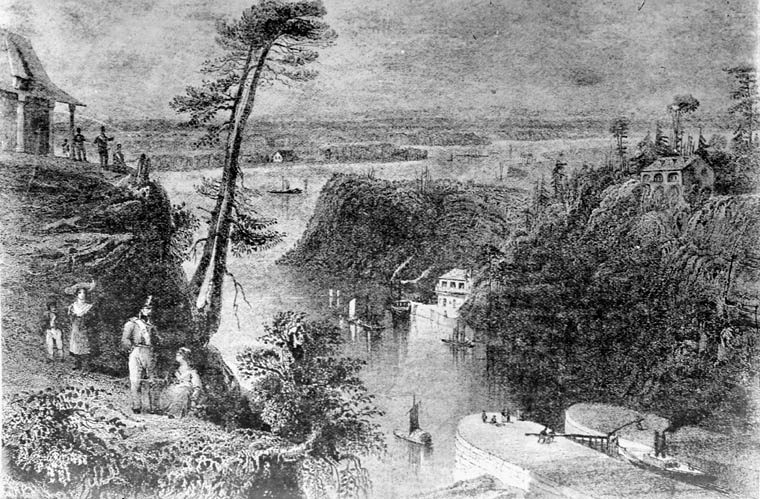
The Rideau Canal in Ottawa, Ontario, Canada, with Parliament Hill and the old "Union Station" visible in the background.

To aid settlement and the timber trade, the nineteenth century saw a spree of canal building projects across the region. Canals could not only bypass rapids and falls, but they could connect previously unlinked parts of the river system. They also made transport of goods far easier and safer. Canals were created for the timber trade, the transport of wheat, and also for military reasons.

The construction of the Rideau Canal was one of the first projects in Upper Canada to employ thousands of laborers. It was under the control of the British military. The British officers and the contractors they hired both looked at the workers as instruments of production required to facilitate the most economic completion of the project. Because of the shortage of jobs, labourers had little choice but to endure difficult and often dangerous working and living conditions. The response of workers to these harsh conditions was militant but sporadic. They tended to act against individual property owners and contractors in order to obtain the immediate necessities for survival. More concerted activity was discouraged in large part by the military which posted soldiers along the line of the canal to suppress dissent and ensure a cheap supply of labour.

Canals such as the Rideau Canal, the Welland Canal, the Trent–Severn Waterway were massive engineering projects, and huge expenditures. The government of Upper Canada was bankrupted by these projects, and this was an important factor in the merging of Upper Canada with the still solvent Lower Canada into one colony in 1840.

== Railways ==
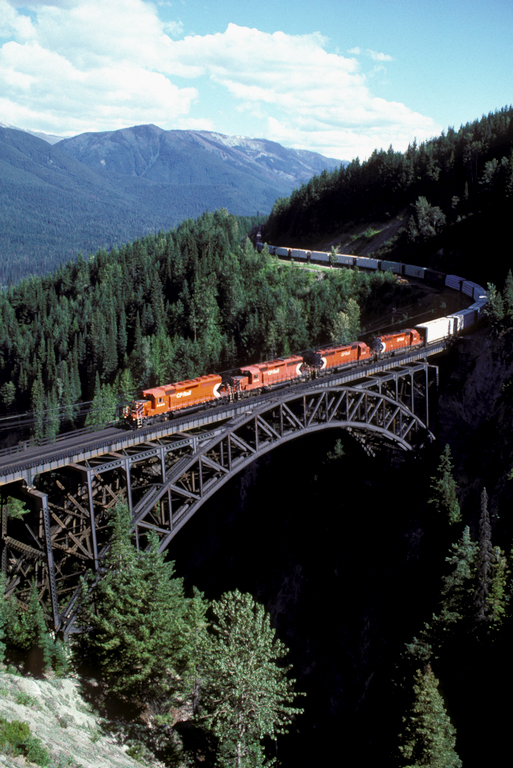
A Canadian Pacific Railway freight eastbound over the Stoney Creek Bridge, British Columbia.

The national government strongly supported railway construction for political goals. First, it wanted to knit the far-flung provinces together. Second, it wanted to maximize trade within Canada and minimize trade with the United States to avoid becoming an economic satellite. The Grand Trunk Railway of Canada linked Toronto and Montreal in 1853. Lines to Portland in Maine (which was ice-free), Michigan and Chicago, were subsequently opened. By 1870 it was the longest railway in the world.

The Intercolonial Railway, finished in 1876, linked the Maritimes to Quebec and Ontario, tying them to the new Confederation. Entrepreneurs in Montreal sought direct lines into the U.S. and shunned connections with the Maritimes, with a goal of competing with American railroad lines heading west to the Pacific. Joseph Howe, Charles Tupper, and other Nova Scotia leaders used the rhetoric of a "civilizing mission" centered on their British heritage, because Atlantic-centered railway projects promised to make Halifax the eastern terminus of an intercolonial railway system tied to London. Leonard Tilley, New Brunswick's most ardent railway promoter, championed the cause of "economic progress", stressing that Atlantic Canadians needed to pursue the most cost-effective transportation connections possible if they wanted to expand their influence beyond local markets. Advocating an intercolonial connection to Canada, and a western extension into larger American markets in Maine and beyond, New Brunswick entrepreneurs promoted ties to the United States first, connections with Halifax second, and routes into central Canada last. Thus metropolitan rivalries between Montreal, Halifax, and Saint John led Canada to build more railway lines per capita than any other industrializing nation, even though it lacked capital resources, and had too little freight and passenger traffic to allow the systems to turn a profit.

Saint John was cut off by the Confederation promise of an Intercolonial Railway. E B Chandler, of New Brunswick's north shore, saw to it that the rail line went from ice-bound Montreal along the St. Lawrence and down the North Shore of New Brunswick bringing New Brunswick no benefit except at Moncton. From there the distance to Halifax and Saint John were about equal. So even though Saint John was half as far from Montreal as Halifax, the new federal policy helped Halifax outpace Saint John as the winter port for Canada. When the St. Lawrence opened in the 1950s, yet another Federal government policy killed the port of Saint John. Eventually a rail line was built from Saint John through Maine USA to Montreal. However, Montreal businessmen preferred Portland USA even though the Saint John River Valley, with no rail line, was a shorter route from Quebec. So Canadian Prairie wheat was shipped four months of the year through the port of Portland, Maine, USA. Saint John has dwindled from being the fifth-largest city in Canada at Confederation to the fourth largest city in Atlantic Canada now and 32nd largest city in Canada.

Den Otter (1997) challenges popular assumptions that Canada built transcontinental railways because it feared the annexationist schemes of aggressive Americans. Instead Canada overbuilt railroads because it hoped to compete with, even overtake Americans in the race for continental riches. It downplayed the more realistic Maritimes-based London-oriented connections and turned to utopian prospects for the farmlands and minerals of the west. The result was closer ties between north and south, symbolized by the Grand Trunk's expansion into the American Midwest. These economic links promoted trade, commerce, and the flow of ideas between the two countries, integrating Canada into a North American economy and culture by 1880. About 700,000 Canadians migrated to the U.S. in the late 19th century. The Canadian Pacific, paralleling the American border, opened a vital link to British Canada, and stimulated settlement of the Prairies. The CP was affiliated with James J. Hill's American railways, and opened even more connections to the south. The connections were two-way, as thousands of American moved to the Prairies after their own frontier had closed.

Two additional transcontinental lines were built to the west coast—three in all—but that was far more than the traffic would bear, making the system simply too expensive. One after another, the federal government was forced to take over the lines and cover their deficits. In 1923 the government merged the Grand Trunk, Grand Trunk Pacific, Canadian Northern and National Transcontinental lines into the new Canadian National Railways system. Since most of the equipment was imported from Britain or the U.S., and most of the products carried were from farms, mines or forests, there was little stimulation to domestic manufacturing. On the other hand, the railways were essential to the growth of the wheat regions in the Prairies, and to the expansion of coal mining, lumbering, and paper making. Improvements to the St. Lawrence waterway system continued apace, and many short lines were built to river ports.

== Confederation ==
The repeal of the British Corn Laws and of preferential treatment for the British colonies led many in British North America to realize that the motherland could no longer be counted on economically. In 1854, the Canadian colonies signed Canadian–American Reciprocity Treaty with the United States to try to ensure access to the American market. This treaty was cancelled in 1866, however, leaving the colonies once again adrift.

The railways were also an important factor. The Province of Canada had again nearly bankrupted itself by promising unwise subsidies to railway companies. The Maritime colonies wanted a railroad, but as disunited as they were, building one would be all but impossible.

Both the Maritime colonies and the Province of Canada desired access to the large and unexploited western hinterland. They hoped that if these areas were developed they would become a market for their manufactured goods, and provide exports for the eastern ports.

For these reasons and others, the colonies of Nova Scotia, New Brunswick and the two Canadas agreed to merge into one federation in 1867. While in name it was a confederation, the new constitution, the British North America Act outlined a strongly centralized federation. The federal government had control of most of the taxation power, and was responsible for the largest expenditures, railroads, canals and the military. The provinces were given exclusive jurisdiction over what at the time seemed merely local or minor matters such as health care and education. The pledge to build the Intercolonial Railway of Canada linking the Maritimes to Quebec and Ontario was finally realized in the 1870s.

In 1871, British Columbia, which was nearing bankruptcy due to railway construction agreed to join the union in exchange for a transcontinental railroad. Prince Edward Island joined in 1873 when the national government provided $800,000 for buying out the landlords who held large blocks of island land. All private holdings over 1,000 acres were sold to the province.

== The National Policy ==
The first Prime Minister of the new nation was John A. Macdonald, and he outlined what would be Canada's economic program for decades. This would be the National Policy a system of protective tariffs that would encourage the development of Canadian manufacturing. This would be combined with great railway building projects such as the Canadian Pacific Railway to link the east with the west and the Intercolonial Railway to link central Canada with Atlantic Canada. Other plans for the National Policy were the promotion of Canadian Identity and the population of western Canada.

Canada had traditionally been committed to free trade and had only had one experiment with a protective tariff with the Cayley-Galt Tariff of 1858. This policy has long been controversial as it is seen to have favoured Central Canada at the expense of the Maritimes and the West.

Beginning in 1897, the National Policy included tariff preferences for imports from Britain, and these margins of preference were widened in 1898 and 1900. According to one study, Canada's adoption of imperial preference had the effect of substantially reorienting Canadian imports toward Britain at a time when the United States was competing more intensely in the Canadian market.

== Post-Confederation slump: 1870 to 1890s ==
In the years after Confederation, the once-buoyant BNA economy slowed , an event at the time some blamed on union or government railway policy, but was more likely caused by the Long Depression that was affecting the entire world. Demand for Canadian resources slumped, and protectionist policies in the United States and Europe hurt Canada's trade.

There was little immigration to Canada during this period. Despite efforts to settle the west including the Dominion Lands Act of 1872, few immigrants were willing to settle on Canada's colder and drier prairies when open land was still plentiful in the United States. In the thirty years after Confederation, Canada experienced a net out flow of migrants, as a large number of Canadians relocated to the United States.

In the early part of the nineteenth century, the economies of the Canadian Maritimes were the most industrialized, and prosperous in British North America. The 1850s and 1860s were especially prosperous. By the start of the twentieth century, however, they were far poorer than the rest of the country, and remain so to this day. It has been said that the provinces never emerged from the post-Confederation slump. See Economy of the Maritimes for a full discussion of this issue.

== Boom years ==
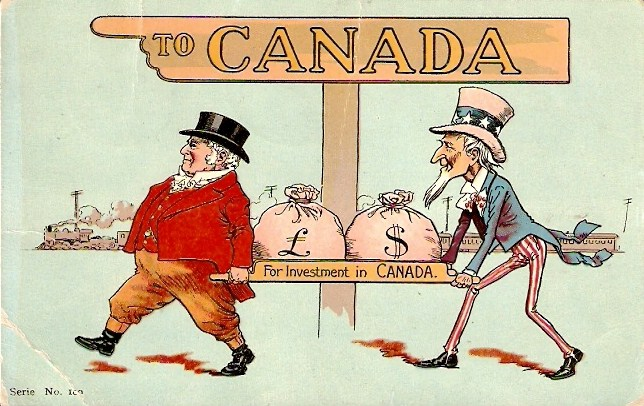
Investors from the United Kingdom and the United States helped fuel the country's economic growth (from a postcard sent in 1907).

The economy improved dramatically after 1896, and from that year until 1914, Canada had the world's fastest-growing economy. The west was settled, the population grew quickly, so that by 1900, Prime Minister Wilfrid Laurier could predict that the twentieth century would be Canada's century as the nineteenth was the United States's. The cause of this boom is debated. Whether the settlement of the west was a cause or effect of the boom is one of the most important issues. Globally the economy was improving with the end of the Long Depression. The last semi-humid farmland in the United States was exhausted, leaving Canada with the best unexploited farm land in North America. Technological changes from the steel plow to combine harvesters played an important role, but perhaps the most important development was the practice of dry farming that allowed farmers to profitably grow wheat on the semi-arid southern prairies.

The most noted expansion was in western Canada, but at the same time Central Canada was undergoing a period of significant industrialization.

While western and central Canada boomed during the pre-World War I years the economies of the three Maritime provinces grew far more slowly. There is also much debate over the cause of this, but its consequence was a growing disaffection with Confederation in the east, manifested by the Maritime Rights movement.

== Farming ==
=== Ontario ===
In Ontario farming was generally quite profitable, especially after 1896. The major changes involved "mechanization of technology and a shift toward output of high-grade consumer oriented products", such as milk, eggs and vegetables for the fast-growing urban markets. It took farmers a half century to appreciate the value of high-protein soybean crops. Introduced in the 1890s, acceptance was slow until 1943–52, when farmers in the southwestern counties expanded production. Farmers increasingly demanded more information on the best farming techniques. Their demands led to farm magazine and agricultural fairs. In 1868 the assembly created an agricultural museum, which morphed into the Ontario Agricultural College in Guelph in 1874.

=== Prairies ===
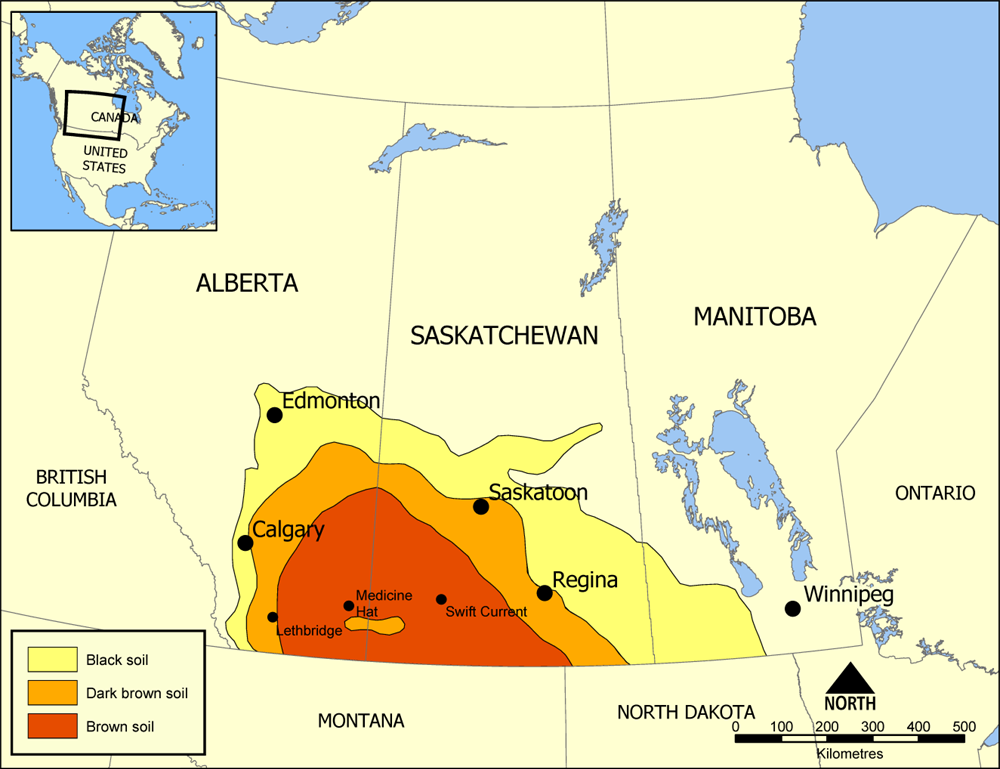
The Prairie provinces, highlighting Palliser's Triangle

Wheat was the golden crop that built the economy of the Prairie provinces of Manitoba, Saskatchewan and Alberta and filled outbound trains headed for ports to carry the grain to Europe. The tall grain elevator alongside the railway tracks became a crucial element of the Prairie grain trade after 1890. It boosted "King Wheat" to regional dominance by integrating the region's economy with the rest of Canada. Used to efficiently load grain into railroad cars, grain elevators came to be clustered in "lines" and their ownership tended to concentrate in the hands of increasingly fewer companies, many controlled by Americans. The main commercial entities involved in the trade were the Canadian Pacific Railway and the powerful grain syndicates. Dramatic changes in the grain trade took place in the 1940s, notably the amalgamation of grain elevator companies. By the 1870s Saskatchewan was the center, followed by Alberta, Manitoba and Ontario, as the spread of railway lines allowed easy exports to Britain. By 1910 wheat made up 22% of Canada's exports, rising to 25% in 1930 despite the sharp decline in prices during the worldwide Great Depression.

Norrie argues that the necessity of using dry farming techniques created special risks and the farmers responded by using summer fallow rather than the risky but more productive use of substitute crops or the planting of wheat every year. Tenants often preferred the safety of sharecropping to the hazards (and higher returns) of cash rental, and showed an interest in crop insurance. Because farmers were averse to risk, grain production was less than it might have been.

Recklessness, greed, and overoptimism played a part in the early-20th-century financial crisis on the Canadian wheat frontier. Beginning in 1916, the Palliser Triangle, a semiarid region in Alberta and Saskatchewan, suffered a decade of dry years and crop failures that culminated in financial ruin for many of the region's wheat farmers. Overconfidence on the part of farmers, financiers, the Canadian Pacific, and the Canadian government led to land investments and development in the Palliser on an unprecedented and dangerous scale. A large share of this expansion was funded by mortgage and loan companies in Britain eager to make overseas investments. British money managers were driven by a complex set of global economic forces including a decline in British investment opportunities, excess capital, and massive investment expansion on the Canadian frontier. Reduced grain production in Europe and increased grain production in the Prairie Provinces also encouraged the export of capital from London. The mythical image of the Palliser as an abundant region, coupled with a growing confidence in technology, created a false sense of security and stability. Between 1908 and 1913 British firms lent vast sums to Canadian farmers to plant their wheat crops; only when the drought began in 1916 did it become clear that far too much credit had been extended.

== The First World War and the Roaring Twenties ==
Canada played an extraordinarily large role in the First World War relative to the size of its population. It sent over hundreds of thousands of troops, and was also the granary and arms producer for the allied side. This led to a further boom on the prairies as wheat prices skyrocketed. The rest of the country, even the Maritimes, benefited from an increase in manufacturing.

The immediate post-war years saw a short, but severe, recession as the economy readjusted to the end of wartime production. By 1921, the Canadian economy was back on its feet and rapidly expanding. In the 1920s, there was an unprecedented increase in the standard of living as items that had been luxury goods such as radios, automobiles, and electric lights—not to mention flush toilets—became common place across the nation. The boom lasted until 1929.

== The Great Depression ==
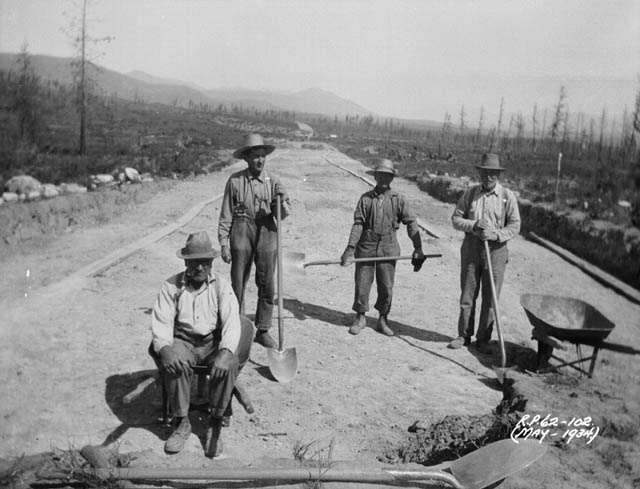
Road construction at Kimberly-Wasa, British Columbia. The federal government established Relief Projects in 1933 during the height of the Great Depression for unemployed married men of British descent

Canada was hard hit by the Great Depression. When the American economy began to collapse in the late 1920s the close economic links and the central banking system meant that the malaise quickly spread across the border. The world demand fell for wheat, lumber and mining products; prices fell, profits plunged, and unemployment soared.

In May 1930, US raised the tariff with the Smoot–Hawley Tariff Act. Canada retaliated by imposing new tariffs on 16 products that accounted altogether for around 30% of U.S. exports to Canada. Following Britain's lead, Canada then forged closer economic links with the British Empire via the British Empire Economic Conference (Ottawa Conference) of 1932 by establishing a zone of limited tariffs within the Empire but high tariffs towards states outside of the Empire. According to a 2024 study, the impact of the agreement on Canada was limited, as Canada already had a highly protectionist trade policy.

By 1933, 30% of the labour force was out of work, and one fifth of the population became dependent on government assistance. Wages fell as did prices; debts did not fall and they became more burdensome. Gross National Expenditure had declined 42% from the 1929 levels. In some areas, the decline was far worse. In the rural areas of the prairies two-thirds of the population were on relief. Population growth contracted markedly as immigration slowed, and birth rates fell as people postponed marriage and family life until they were more secure. Crime rates increased, and a new class of unemployed vagrants appeared.

Canada remained in depression far longer than the United States, not passing 1929 levels until 1939, with the outbreak of the Second World War. There was no national recovery program similar to Franklin D. Roosevelt's New Deal.

== The Second World War and the boom years ==
The turn around brought about by the command economy imposed at the beginning of the Second World War was immense. Unemployment virtually disappeared by 1940 as soldiers were recruited and factories turned to war production. Canada was in the unusual situation of helping Britain financially, through a program similar to the American Lend-Lease.

In the twenty-five years after the war, there was an immense expansion in the Canadian economy. Unemployment remained low and the end of wartime production was quickly turned over to making consumer goods. Canada, along with many other developed nations, firmly established itself as a welfare state with publicly funded health care, the Canada Pension Plan, and other programs.

During this period, the Canadian economy became much more closely integrated with the American one as tariff barriers fell and trade agreements like the Canada-United States Automotive Agreement and the "Hyde Park Declaration" were signed.

== Trade unions ==
Canada's first trade union, the Labourers' Benevolent Association (now International Longshoremen's Association Local 273), formed in Saint John, New Brunswick in 1849. The union was formed when Saint John's longshoremen banded together to lobby for regular pay and a shorter workday. Canadian unionism had early ties with Britain and Ireland. Tradesmen who came from Britain brought traditions of the British trade union movement, and many British unions had branches in Canada. Canadian unionism's ties with the United States eventually replaced those with Britain.

Collective bargaining was first recognized in 1945, after the strike by the United Auto Workers at the General Motors' plant in Oshawa, Ontario. Justice Ivan Rand issued a landmark legal decision after the strike in Windsor, Ontario, involving 17,000 Ford workers. He granted the union the compulsory check-off of union dues. Rand ruled that all workers in a bargaining unit benefit from a union-negotiated contract. Therefore, he reasoned they must pay union dues, although they do not have to join the union.

The post-World War II era also saw an increased pattern of unionization in the public service. Teachers, nurses, social workers, professors and cultural workers (those employed in museums, orchestras and art galleries) all sought private-sector collective bargaining rights. The Canadian Labour Congress was founded in 1956 as the national trade union center for Canada.

In the 1970s the federal government came under intense pressures to curtail labour cost and inflation. In 1975, the Liberal government of Pierre Trudeau introduced mandatory price and wage controls. Under the new law, wages increases were monitored and those ruled to be unacceptably high were rolled back by the government.

Pressures on unions continued into the 1980s and '90s. Private sector unions faced plant closures in many manufacturing industries and demands to reduce wages and increase productivity. Public sector unions came under attack by federal and provincial governments as they attempted to reduce spending, reduce taxes and balance budgets. Legislation was introduced in many jurisdictions reversing union collective bargaining rights, and many jobs were lost to contractors.

Prominent domestic unions in Canada include ACTRA, the Canadian Union of Postal Workers, the Canadian Union of Public Employees, the Public Service Alliance of Canada, the National Union of Public and General Employees, and Unifor. International unions active in Canada include the International Alliance of Theatrical Stage Employees, United Automobile Workers, United Food and Commercial Workers, and United Steelworkers.

== Business elite ==
Canada’s business elite, or The Establishment, is a loosely connected network of corporate and financial leaders who dominate decision-making despite publicly disavowing their power. Unlike societies like Great Britain with entrenched class systems, Canada’s elite evolved with shifting industries and geography. It revolved around the “Big Five banks of Canada. Studies of the 1960s by John Porter revealed how a small, predominantly British group controlled wealth and opportunity, while politicians, typically middle class, held little real power. The base of its power shifted from Montreal to Toronto in the late 20th century in a reaction against Quebec nationalism. Later research showed these elites became even more closed and exclusionary, maintaining dominance through elite institutions and generational wealth. Peter C. Newman argues that the Canadian business elite has often aligned itself with foreign interests, particularly American corporations, reflecting a colonial mentality that diminished Canada’s economic sovereignty. Though they donate time and money to cultural causes, elites prioritize protecting privilege, resisting redistributive policies like Pierre Trudeau’s National Energy Program while supporting governments, such as Brian Mulroney’s, that favored corporate autonomy. Historically, Canada’s development has long been shaped less by politics than by the enduring influence of its business elite.

== Recessions since 1980 ==
Canada experienced economic recession in the early 1980s and again in the early 1990s. This led to massive government deficits, high unemployment, and general disaffection. The poor economy helped lead to the overwhelming rejection of the Progressive Conservative Party in the 1993 election, and the fall of other governments such as Bob Rae's Ontario New Democratic Party. The poor economy may have increased support for sovereignty in Quebec, an option that was just barely rejected in the 1995 Quebec referendum.

A brief recovery in 1994 was followed by an economic slump in 1995–1996. Since that date, the Canadian economy has improved markedly, in step with the boom in the United States. In the mid-1990s, Jean Chrétien's Liberal government began to post annual budgetary surpluses, and steadily paid down the national debt. Once referred to as a fiscal basket-case, Canada has become a model of fiscal stability as the government has posted surpluses every fiscal year from 1996 to the 2008 recession.

The recession brought on in the United States by the collapse of the dot-com bubble beginning in 2000, hurt the Toronto Stock Exchange but has affected Canada only mildly. It is one of the few times Canada has avoided following the United States into a recession.

Following this downturn, Canadian economic growth has been concentrated in the petroleum, real estate and income trust sectors.

The 2008 financial crisis and the Great Recession resulted in a significant rise in unemployment in Canada.

Canada's federal debt was estimated to total $566.7 billion for the fiscal year 2010–11, up from $463.7 billion in 2008–09. In addition, Canada's net foreign debt rose by $41 billion to $194 billion in the first quarter of 2010. However, Canada's regulated banking sector (comparatively conservative among G7 nations), the federal government's pre-crisis budgetary surpluses, and its long-term policies of lowering the national debt, resulted in a less severe recession compared to other G8 nations. As of 2015, the Canadian economy has largely stabilized and has seen a modest return to growth, although the country remains troubled by volatile oil prices, sensitivity to the Euro area crisis and higher-than-normal unemployment rates. The federal government and many Canadian industries have also started to expand trade with emerging Asian markets, in an attempt to diversify exports; Asia is now Canada's second-largest export market after the United States. Widely debated oil pipeline proposals, in particular, are hoped to increase exports of Canadian oil reserves to China.

== Healthcare system ==
Canada's healthcare system, colloquially called "Medicare", is a significant economic factor. As most aspects of the healthcare system are financed from general government revenues, and as provincial governments bear the majority of these costs, healthcare has grown to become the largest component of Canadian provincial budgets. Medicare is also a relevant factor in the decisions of employers to locate businesses in Canada (where government pays most of employees' healthcare costs) as opposed to the United States (where employers more directly pay many healthcare costs).

== Poverty ==
Poverty in Canada remains a prevalent issue within some segments of society. The most frequently quoted measure, the low-income cut off or LICO, displays a downward trend since 2000 after a spike in the mid-1990s and was 10.8% as of 2005. Another measure, published by the free market think tank Fraser Institute, displays a constant downward trend since 1970 and stood at 4.9% as of 2004. There is a debate about which measure is more valid.

== GDP history ==
Despite similarities in history, law and culture, Australia and Canada followed quite different macroeconomic histories. Australia's GDP per caput was well above those of Britain and the United States in 1870, and more than twice the Canadian level. By the 1980s, however, Canada's GDP almost matched the United States, and was well above that of Australia and Britain.

The following table displays the change in real GDP from the previous year, from 2000 to 2011:

Year	+/− Change
2000	+5.2%
2001	+1.8%
2002	+2.9%
2003	+1.0%
2004	+3.5%
2005	+3.0%
2006	+2.8%
2007	+2.2%
2008	+0.5%
2009	−2.5%
2010	+3.2%
2011	+2.5%
2012	+1.7%

== National debt ==
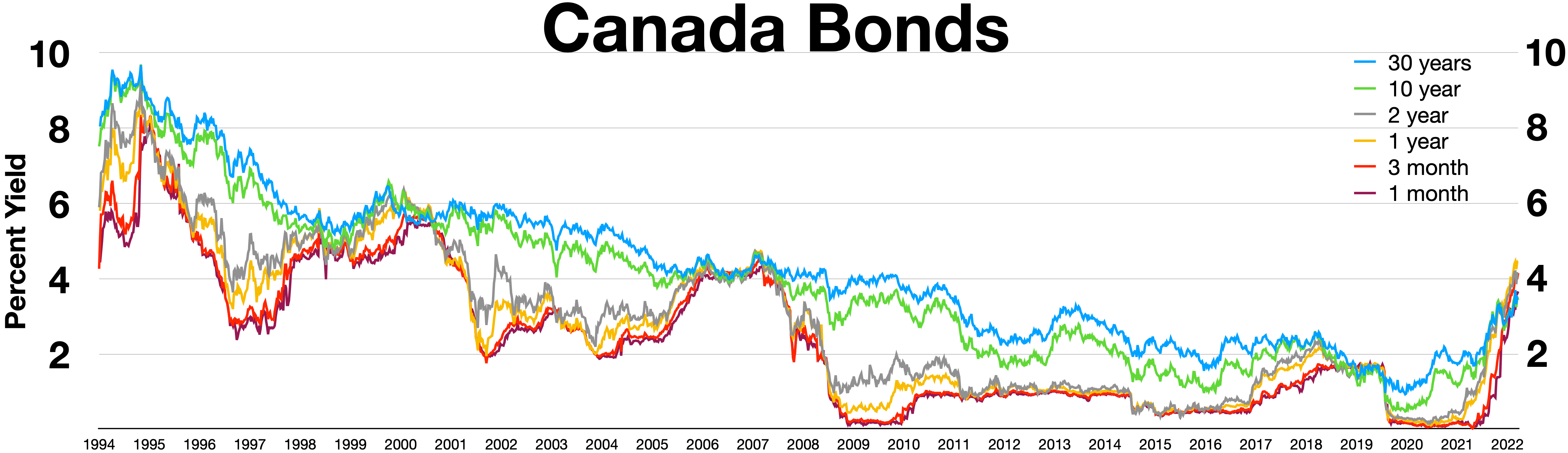
Canada bonds 30 year 10 year 2 year 1 year 3 month 1 month

End of Fiscal Year	Net Debt $Billions Adjusted for inflation, 2014	as % of GDP	GDP $Billions
1962	14.8 (113.8)	33.0%	44.9
1971	20.3 (116.6)	20.6%	98.4
1981	91.9 (219.1)	25.5%	360.5
1991	377.7 (557.7)	55.1%	685.4
1997	562.9 (765.1)	63.8%	882.7
2008	457.6 (493.3)	31.4%	1,453.6
2010	519.1 (543.4)	35.5%	1,458.8
2014	611.9	32.5%	1,649.2

== See also ==
- Canadian and American economies compared
- Economic impact of immigration to Canada
- Economy of Canada
- Historiography of Canada
- History of Canada
- History of the petroleum industry in Canada
- Science and technology in Canada
- Timeline of Canadian history
- Technological and industrial history of Canada
- List of defunct Canadian companies
- List of recessions in Canada

== References and further reading ==
- Bannister, Jerry. "Atlantic Canada in an Atlantic World? Northeastern North America in the Long 18th Century." Acadiensis 43.2 (2014) online.
- Bliss, Michael. Northern Enterprise: Five Centuries of Canadian Business. (1987).
- Bonham, Mark S. ed. Becoming 150: 150 Years of Canadian Business History (2018)
- Bonham, Mark S. ed. Trade-Offs: The History of Canada-U.S. Trade Negotiations (2019) essays by experts on Reciprocity Agreement of 1854, the AutoPact (1965), the Free Trade Agreement (1987), the North American Free Trade Agreement (1994), and the United States Mexico Canada Agreement (2018).
- Bordo, Michael D., Angela Redish, and Hugh Rockoff. "Why Didn’t Canada Have a Banking Crisis in 2008 (or in 1930, or 1907, or . . .)?" Economic History Review 68#1 (2015): 218–43
- Buckley, Thomas R. "Multinational Companies and the Cultural Industries: W.H. Smith in Canada, 1950–1989." Business History Review 94.4 (2020): 699–727.
- Creighton, D. G. (1937). The Commercial Empire of the St. Lawrence, 1760–1850. Archived from the original on 12 October 2012 – via Questia.
- Currie, A.W. Canadian Economic Development 1st ed. 1942; 4th ed. 1963.
- Easterbrook, William Thoma; Aitken, Hugh G. J (1988). Canadian economic history. University of Toronto Press. ISBN 0-8020-6696-8.
- Firestone, Otto J. "Development of Canada's Economy, 1850-1900" in Trends in the American Economy in the Nineteenth Century (1960): 217–252.online
- Firestone, Otto J. "Canada's External Trade and Net Foreign Balance, 1851-1900." in Trends in the American Economy in the Nineteenth Century (1960): 757-771. online
- Geloso, Vincent (2016) The seeds of divergence: the economy of French North America, 1688 to 1760. PhD thesis, The London School of Economics and Political Science (LSE).
- Granatstein, J. L. A Reader's Guide to Canadian History: Confederation to the Present (1982), historiography including economic history
- Greasley, David, and Les Oxley. "A tale of two dominions: comparing the macroeconomic records of Australia and Canada since 1870." Economic History Review 51.2 (1998): 294–318. online Archived 10 July 2023 at the Wayback Machine
- Green, Alan G. "Twentieth-Century Canadian Economic History" in Stanley L. Engerman and Robert E Gallman, eds. Cambridge Economic History of the United States volume 3 (2000) pp 191–248.
- Innis, Harold A. Essays in Canadian Economic History (1956) online edition
- Innis, Harold A. History of the Canadian Pacific Railway (1923) online
- Li, Eva Xiaoling, and Peter S. Li. "New immigrants from China to Canada, 1980–2009: Migration patterns and economic performance." in Trans-Pacific Mobilities: The Chinese and Canada (2017) pp: 117–137.
- McCalla, Douglas. Planting The Province: The Economic History of Upper Canada, 1784–1870 (U of Toronto Press, 1993). 446 pp.
- Marr, William L., and Donald G. Paterson. Canada: An Economic History (Toronto, 1980)
- Morton, Desmond. Working People: An Illustrated History of the Canadian Labour Movement (1999)
- Muise, D. A. ed., A Reader's Guide to Canadian History: i, Beginnings to Confederation (1982); historiography
- Naylor, R. Thomas. The History of Canadian Business: 1897–1914. Vol. 1, The Banks and Finance Capital; Vol. 2, Industrial Development (2 vol 1975)
- Neill, Robin. A History of Canadian Economic Thought (1991) online
- Norrie, Kenneth, Douglas Owram, and J.C. Herbert Emery. A History of the Canadian Economy 4th ed. (2007)
- Palmer, Bryan D. Working Class Experience: Rethinking the History of Canadian Labour, 1800–1991 (1992)
- Parcerisas, Lluis, and Jérôme Dupras. "From mixed farming to intensive agriculture: energy profiles of agriculture in Quebec, Canada, 1871–2011." Regional environmental change 18.4 (2018): 1047-1057 online.
- Pomfret, Richard. The Economic Development of Canada 2nd ed. (1993)
- Porter, John. The vertical mosaic; an analysis of social class and power in Canada (University of Toronto Press, 1965) online
- Russell P. A. How agriculture made Canada: Farming in the nineteenth century (McGill-Queen's University Press, 2012)
- Sandwell, R. W. "Notes toward a history of rural Canada, 1870-1940." in Social Transformation in Rural Canada: Community, Cultures, and Collective Action (2013): 21–42.
- Taylor, Graham D. Imperial standard: Imperial Oil, Exxon, and the Canadian oil industry from 1880 (University of Calgary Press, 2019). online
- Taylor, Graham D., and Peter Baskerville. A Concise History of Business in Canada, 1994
- Taylor, M. Brook, ed. Canadian History: A Reader's Guide. Vol. 1. Doug Owram, ed. Canadian History: A Reader's Guide. Vol. 2. (1994). historiography

=== Primary sources ===
- Innis, H. A., and A. R. M. Lower, ed. Select Documents in Canadian Economic History, 1783–1885 (1933), 846pp
