= History of the petroleum industry in Canada (natural gas) =

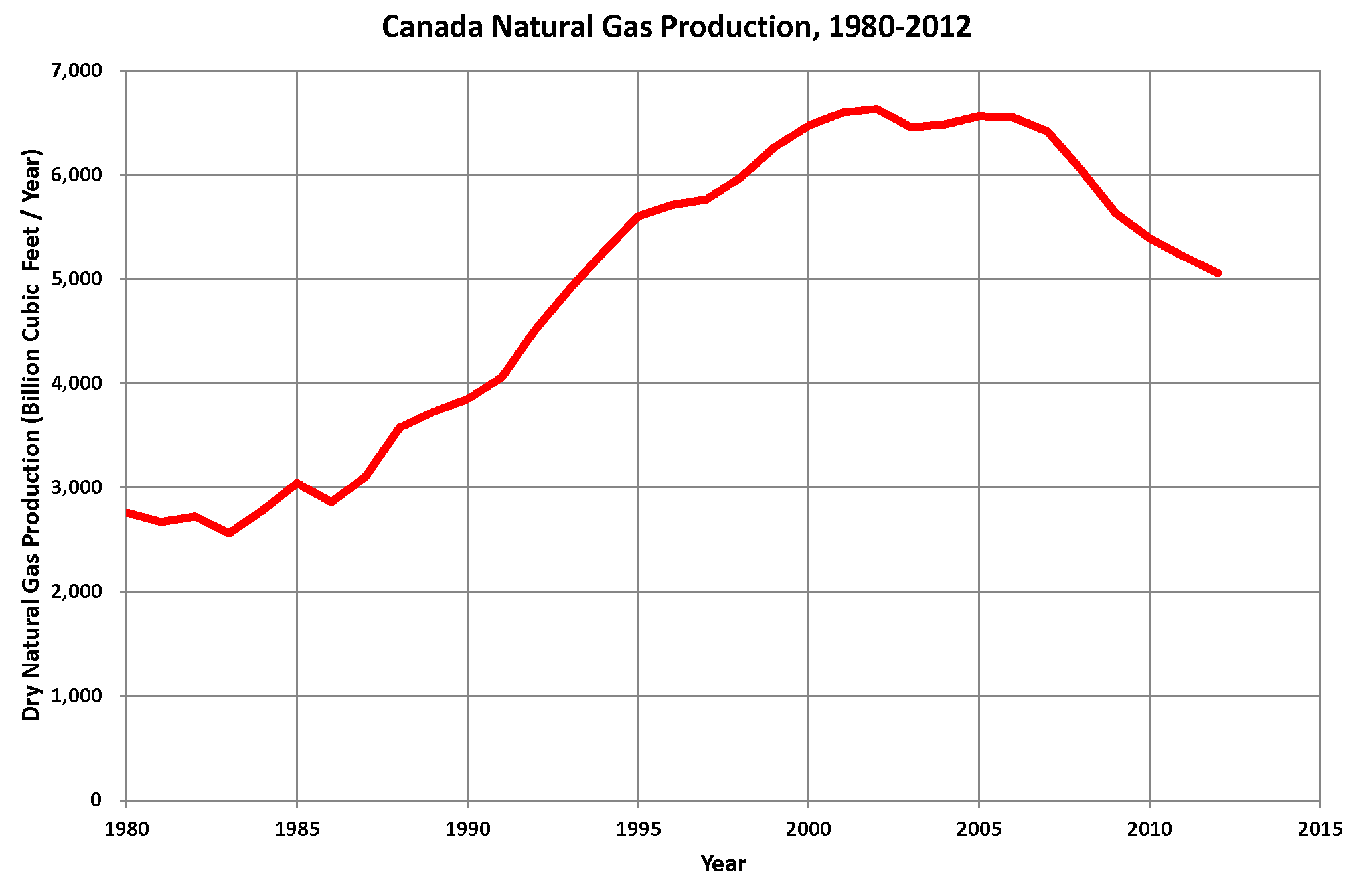
Canada natural gas production

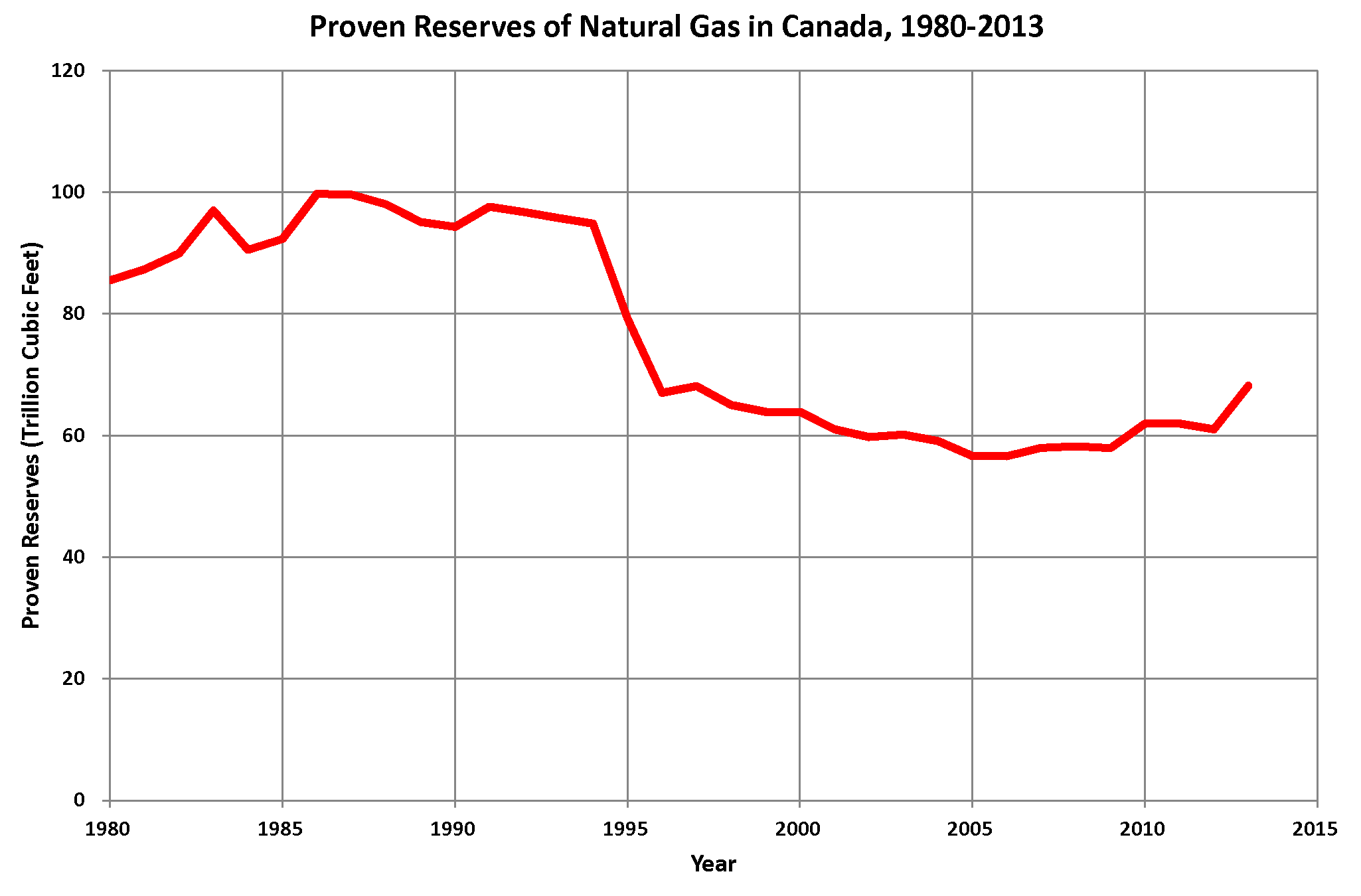
Proved natural gas reserves in Canada

Natural gas has been used almost as long as crude oil in Canada, but its commercial development was not as rapid. This is because of special properties of this energy commodity: it is a gas, and it frequently contains impurities. The technical challenges involved to first process and then pipe it to market are therefore considerable. Furthermore, the costs of pipeline building make the whole enterprise capital intensive, requiring both money and engineering expertise, and large enough markets to make the business profitable.

Until it became commercially viable, natural gas was often a nuisance. Dangerous to handle and hard to get to market, early oilmen despised it as a poor relation to its rich cousin crude oil. Although early processing procedures were able to remove water, in the 19th century discoveries were only developed if consumers could use the gas just as it came out of the ground. If the gas required further processing or needed to be piped a long distance to market, the producer shut in the well. Flares got rid of gas coming from oil wells.

Natural gas processing changes the commodity in two critical ways. First, it extracts valuable by-products; second, it renders natural gas fit to be transported to a point for commercial sale and consumption. Through the use of evolving technology, the gas processing industry of each era extracts higher percentages of a wider range of hydrocarbons and other commercial by-products than its predecessors. It also removes ever-higher percentages of dangerous and other unwanted impurities. Steady growth has made natural gas a major industry, with 180 cubic kilometres of gas flowing from Canadian fields to market, every year.

Part of a series on Canada's petroleum industry, this entry focuses on the second of these two functions of gas processing - removing impurities from the gas stream - rather than recovering natural gas liquids, described elsewhere. Of course, most large plants perform both functions, and plants have no other ultimate purpose than to quickly, safely and profitably turn raw gas into products to be safely shipped (mostly by pipeline) to market. The discussion covers gas processing as an engineering feat, critical developments in exploration and development and the fundamentals of the marketplace.

== Early times ==
A small natural gas industry in Central Canada had already been around for several decades, but the most significant event in the industry's early history was probably the drilling of a well near Medicine Hat in 1890, in search of coal for the railway. The well encountered a large flow of natural gas, and this prompted town officials to approach the Canadian Pacific Railway with a view to drilling deeper for gas. The resulting enterprise led to the development of the Medicine Hat gas field in 1904. The community took advantage of the natural resource and became the first town or city in western Canada with a gas utility.

Natural gas service began in Calgary somewhat later, when A.W. Dingman formed the Calgary Natural Gas Company. He drilled a successful well in east Calgary, laid pipe to the Calgary Brewing and Malting Company site and began providing gas to the brewery on April 10, 1910. As in Medicine Hat, gas mains soon provided domestic fuel and street lighting.

In a parallel development Eugene Coste, who had been a pioneer in the development of Ontario's natural gas industry, moved west. He drilled the locally famous Old Glory gas well near Bow Island, Alberta, in 1909. In 1912, his Canadian Western Natural Gas Company built a 280-kilometre pipeline connecting the Bow Island field to Lethbridge and Calgary in 86 days. It augmented the Dingman enterprise in Calgary, which was unable to supply the growing demands of the city. By 1913, several other towns in southern Alberta boasted natural gas service from the Canadian Western system. Coste's pioneering enterprise provided fuel to nearly 7,000 customers.

== Canada's first sweetening plant ==
Sour gas, as it is known, in its natural state is laced with hydrogen sulfide (H_{2}S), which can be lethal if inhaled in even tiny concentrations. (The more general term acid gas refers to natural gas with any acidic gas in it - carbon dioxide (CO_{2}), for example.)

The process of taking hydrogen sulphide out of a gas stream is called "sweetening" the gas. The Union Natural Gas Company of Canada (now Union Gas Ltd.) of Chatham-Kent, Ontario built Canada's first Koppers process sweetening plant in 1924 at Port Alma, Ontario, to scrub Tillbury gas. Hydrogen sulphide is a dangerous substance which at low concentrations has an obnoxious rotten egg smell. This odour annoyed Union's customers and prompted it to build the Port Alma plant. It removed hydrogen sulphide by exposing the sour gas to dissolved soda ash. Although previously used on coal gas, the application at the Port Alma plant was the first time this process sweetened natural gas.

The second Canadian sweetening plant followed a year later in Turner Valley, and used the same process. The first gas found at Turner Valley had been sweet but the Royalite #4 discovery of 1924, from a deeper horizon, was sour. Royalite built the Turner Valley sweetening plant in order to sell its gas to Canadian Western Natural Gas for distribution.

The technology of the day did not render the hydrogen sulphide harmless. Instead, the producer disposed of the substance by burning it and dispersing the by-products into the air from two tall stacks. One chemical result of burning hydrogen sulphide emissions was sulfur dioxide, another toxic gas. Since hydrogen sulphide is heavier than air, it settled to the ground, dispersed enough to be less than lethal.

Hydrogen sulphide was always in the air in small concentrations. Turner Valley had a rotten egg odour on most days.

== Gas conservation after Leduc ==
As Alberta became an ever-larger oil producer after the Leduc discovery, the Conservation Board acted to prevent any repetition of the natural gas waste so common in Turner Valley. The board developed a broad conservation policy for natural gas. It prohibited producing natural gas from an oil reservoir's gas cap before the oil was fully produced, and included provisions aimed at conserving the natural gas often produced along with the oil. For this reason, these plants became known as "gas conservation plants."

The first of these new plants was Imperial's Leduc facility (sometimes called Imperial Devon or Imperial Leduc). It sweetened the gas with monoethanolamine (MEA), then extracted the liquid hydrocarbons by refrigeration. Northwestern Utilities Limited bought the gas at $14.12 per thousand cubic metres and distributed it in Edmonton. Trucks transported the propane, butane and "pentanes plus" (the Canadian term for heavier gas liquids) until 1954, when three pipelines began moving the products from Imperial Leduc to Edmonton. When markets could not be found for the propane, the board occasionally granted permission to flare it.

The next important plant built in Canada resulted from the discovery in 1944 of a wet sour gas find by Shell Oil at Jumping Pound, west of Calgary. Calgary, Exshaw (where there was a cement factory) and Banff were all potential markets for Jumping Pound gas, but the sour gas first required processing and sweetening. The gas plant began operating in 1951.

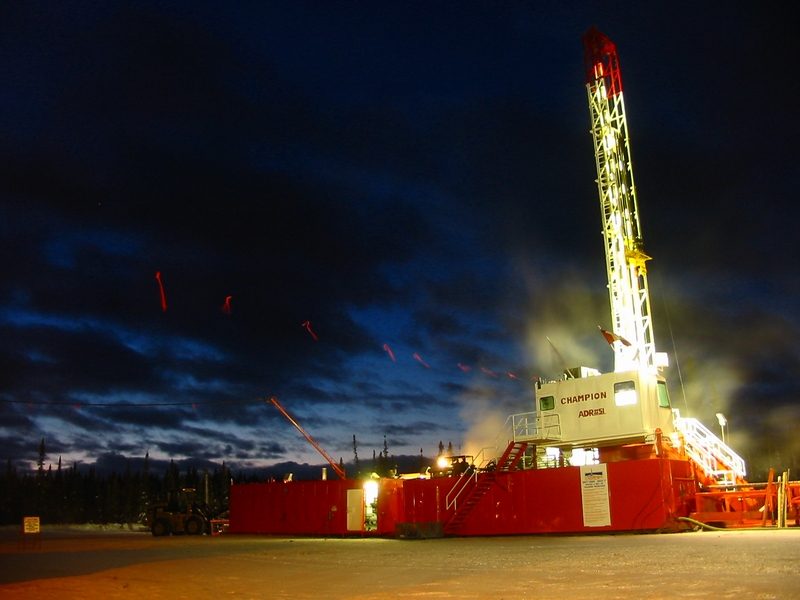
Contemporary drilling rig in Northeastern British Columbia

Built "California-style," with few buildings or other provisions for a cold climate, the original Jumping Pound plant ran into problems. During the first winter, water condensation and other cold weather problems led to one operational failure after another. When the second winter arrived, buildings sheltered most of the facilities. Shell Jumping Pound is sometimes referred to as Canada's "sour gas laboratory," for much of the industry's early understanding of sour gas processing came from experience there. It was the first sulphur plant in the world, its sulphur unit going into production in 1952. For this distinction it narrowly beat out the Madison Natural Gas plant which began extracting sulphur at Turner Valley later the same year.

As the Westcoast and TransCanada natural gas pipelines went into operation in 1957, a new and better day dawned for Canadian gas processing. Most of the gas that travelled those pipelines needed processing to meet the specifications of pipeline companies. Consequently, the late 1950s and early 1960s saw a boom in gas plant construction.

In 1957, a new gas plant at Taylor, near Fort St. John, British Columbia, began supplying Westcoast Transmission Co. Ltd. This plant's practices differed from those used in Alberta in a number of ways. For example, although it generally required dehydration, sweetening and processing for liquid hydrocarbons, companies transported the natural gas from northeastern British Columbia long distances before processing it further. Consequently, while planning the Westcoast pipeline, the field operators agreed to process all the gas at a single facility, rather than have individual gas plants in every major production area. At 10 million cubic metres per day, the Taylor plant had the capacity to process as much natural gas as all eleven of the other gas plants operating in Canada combined. The plant was also by far Canada's most northerly. Heavily insulated buildings protected the processing facilities and allowed them to function at temperatures typical of more southerly climes.

== Schemata of a gas plant ==
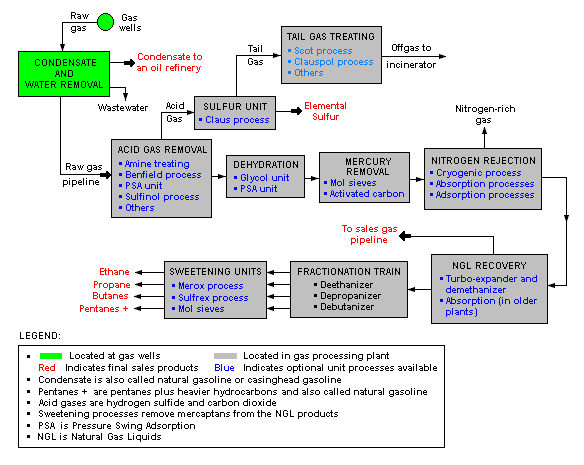

== Selling the products ==
The enormous growth in Canadian processing capacity in the late 1950s and early 1960s created large inventories of natural gas liquids, liquefied petroleum gases and sulfur. Growing supplies sometimes created marketing problems.

=== Natural gas liquids ===
Sales of gas liquids were seldom difficult because of their ready use in oil refining. Refiners also used butane for blending. Propane, on the other hand, presented a challenge because the volumes available greatly exceeded demand.

Companies set out to widen the market with considerable success. Farmers and small communities not served by natural gas adopted it for home heating fuel. In the early 1960s, markets for liquid petroleum gases grew rapidly.

Companies responded by building "straddle" plants. These facilities straddled gas pipelines to extract additional volumes of gas liquids from the gas stream. Where economic, field processors began "deep cutting" their own gas by installing facilities that culled more LPG from the gas through deep refrigeration. In the early 1970s, companies began extracting the even lighter hydrocarbon ethane at some field processing and straddle plants. Ethane became a feedstock for Alberta's growing petrochemical industry, used in the manufacture of ethylene.

=== Sulphur ===
From a slow start in 1952, sulphur production from gas processing snowballed as plant construction boomed in the late 1950s and early 1960s. Tough new regulations enacted by the Alberta government in 1960 forced the industry to reduce its emissions of such sulphur compounds as sulfur dioxide and hydrogen sulphide.

Over the years, sour gas processing technology steadily improved. By 1970, more stringent emission standards were technically feasible. The Alberta government announced new, tougher regulations in 1971. Improvements in sulphur extraction technology and the addition of tail gas clean-up units enabled processors to meet these stricter standards.

The amount of sulphur produced in Alberta increased rapidly, and soon far outstripped demand. By 1963, Alberta's annual sulphur production exceeded one million tonnes, compared with 30,000 tonnes in 1956. In 1973 it peaked at slightly more than 7 million tonnes. Stockpiles grew annually. By 1978, 21 million tonnes of sulphur in large yellow blocks dotted the Alberta countryside. These inventories grew almost every year after 1952, and government and industry became seriously concerned about the surplus. Beginning in 1978, a strong sulphur marketing effort made Canada the largest supplier to international trade. Sales of sulphur generally exceeded production and stockpiles at gas plants began to shrink.

Looking at the large, sophisticated, high-tech enterprise that Canadian gas processing is today, it is hard to imagine the challenges the industry faced as it grew up. Gas processing developed as an adjunct to the construction of the major gas transmission pipeline system, which began operating in the late 1950s.

=== Gas sausages ===
During the 1980s and 1990s the natural gas industry faced a new series of problems. As demand for gas grew, suppliers expanded their capacity and soon a "gas bubble" developed. There was more producible gas than markets demanded. Although market analysts regularly forecast the end of the bubble as only a few years away, the bubble refused to burst. Some called it the "gas sausage", as it extended over time. The perceived problem of large gas inventories overhanging the market and keeping down prices did not begin to disappear until the late 1990s.

Crude oil prices dropped throughout the 1980s and natural gas supplies remained abundant, so consumers began taking advantage of the twin surpluses. Individuals, corporations and governments alike window-shopped for the cheapest crude oil and natural gas available, and demand grew.

In the mid-1980s, conservative governments in Washington, D.C., Ottawa and Edmonton moved their petroleum sectors towards deregulation. Throwing the market open to competition added to the gas surplus and to depressed gas prices. Suppliers across the continent began looking for new customers to make up in volume sales what they were unable to earn from low gas prices. But gas pipelines, built decades before, had little excess capacity.

Debate on a second gas pipeline from Alberta to California served as a good example of changing values during this period. For decades, California consumers opposed rival pipelines for fear of having to pay higher gas prices to cover pipeline construction. Deregulation made the pipeline companies common carriers so that any producer or marketer could buy space on the pipeline to move its gas. Gone were the days when the pipeline company moved the gas and also marketed it.

As deregulation put an end to vertically integrated gas delivery and marketing, consuming regions began crying for additional pipeline capacity. In Alberta, half a continent away from America's east coast and from the San Francisco Bay, cheap gas awaited. All they needed were pipelines. By the late 1980s and early 1990s, governments generally supported throwing open to all contenders the race to build pipelines. Competition among operators moving the gas to market - not government regulation - was supposed to keep transmission costs reasonable in the new milieu.

As pipeline projects proliferated, natural gas producers sought new markets for their inexpensive and apparently plentiful product. Electrical power generation with gas became a growth industry. As coal, hydroelectric and nuclear-powered generation facilities came under attack for environmental reasons, gas stepped in and sold itself as a clean alternative. Businesses arranged for pipelines to transport natural gas for them, found markets for electricity, and even created "cogeneration plants" to sell the heat created by gas-fired generators to other markets.

As long as natural gas supplies exceeded demand, these facilities remained attractive. They used an inexpensive and environmentally friendly fuel. They met immediate needs at only a fraction of the cost of large nuclear, hydro-electric or coal-powered facilities. Although their share of the market would shrink if gas prices rose, these ingenious projects filled an important market niche during the long period of gas surplus.

== Exploration and development ==
The demand for larger supplies of natural gas to meet expanding markets created a need for more gas processing facilities. Industry responded by developing new fields in the rural west. Occasionally this led to tragedy, as in the case of the second of Amoco Canada's Lodgepole blowouts.

=== Lodgepole blowout ===
In 1982 near Lodgepole, Alberta, Amoco was drilling a sour gas well, which blew wild. Especially because the company had experienced a serious blowout in the same gas field five years earlier, regulatory and public opprobrium was intense. Much of the public outrage occurred because, on some days, the rotten-egg odour of hydrogen sulfide (H_{2}S) in the gas could be smelled as far away as Winnipeg, nearly 1,500 kilometres distant.

In this spectacular event, sour gas flowed at an estimated rate of 4.2 million cubic metres (150 million cubic feet) per day. The H_{2}S content of the gas was 28 percent, and the well also produced 3,200 cubic metres per day (20 thousand barrels per day) of sulphur-contaminated, orange-coloured condensate. The well was out of control for 68 days, during 23 of which the well was not ignited. During that time H_{2}S from the blowout killed two blowout specialists and sent 16 other people to hospital. Today, operators are required to ignite the well quickly in the event of a major sour gas blowout. This eliminates the dangers of highly toxic H_{2}S in the air.

When the crew ignited the well, the fire destroyed the Nabors 14E rig (worth about $8 million) in nine minutes; it also scorched 1.6 km^{2} (400 acres) of forest. Amoco's direct costs to bring the well under control were approximately $20 million. Huge amounts of natural gas, natural gas liquids and sulphur were wasted through the disaster. This meant energy lost to consumers, revenues lost to the company, and royalties and taxes lost to government. According to a report commissioned by Alberta's Energy Resources Conservation Board, these and other direct costs totalled about $200 million.

The incident spawned a generation of safety regulations that require the industry to designate hazardous drilling targets as "critical wells" and to use elaborate safety precautions at the drill site. The new regulations imposed much more stringent drilling procedures at critical wells, required specialized safety features on drilling and other equipment, and forced companies to develop detailed emergency response plans before beginning to drill. Combined, these additional costs can range from $250,000 to $500,000 for a single deep sour gas well. Thus, the indirect costs of the blowout have probably been on the order of $1 billion.

=== Caroline ===
Later in the decade, many large companies began reviewing their existing land holdings, looking for discoveries that had eluded earlier exploration. This was partly a money-saving idea - necessary because both gas and oil prices were in decline throughout much of the decade.

One find from such a program was the sour gas discovery at the village of Caroline, Alberta in south-central Alberta, in the mid-1980s. This discovery brought the industry into a new era. Because of the costs and dangers involved in developing sour gas, producers in the past had often shut in these discoveries. In the case of Caroline, this was unthinkable.

As the biggest Canadian gas discovery since the 1970s and its richest gas project ever, the Shell-operated Caroline field stood out as a $10 billion resource jewel. Although classified as a gas field, in the lower-price environment of the day sulfur, liquids and other by-products from the gas promised to exceed the value of the natural gas itself.

However, this discovery proved complicated, environmentally sensitive and economically challenging. The planning and review process took from 1986 to 1990, and set a new standard for community participation and consultation. Two companies, Shell and Husky, competed for the right to operate the field. The public hearing into the development forced the corporations to compete for the right to develop the resource on new terms.

Farmers, acreage owners and other interested parties quickly made their concerns known. The competing corporations were required to respond to these concerns, so the Caroline experience made public consultation an integral part of planning. Sustainable development theories came under close scrutiny, as did all aspects of the gas processing system. When they recognized that public consultation had become critical to the winning bid, the companies raised community relations to a new level.

Eventually, Shell and its backers won the bid. They constructed a processing plant that recovered almost all the sulfur from Caroline production, and was environmentally advanced in other areas.

By the early 1990s, natural gas processing had come of age. Since its infancy, when operators removed only few of a gas stream's impurities, the gas sector had matured to become an important part of the petroleum industry and of the economy itself. Gas moved around the North American continent in unprecedented volumes. It was and is an environmentally desirable fuel, and gas processing is the handmaiden of natural gas sales.

== Supply, demand and price ==
While Canada is one of the world's three largest gas producers (the other two are Russia and the United States), it does not host many of the world's largest gas fields which are currently in production. Several large fields are, however, not yet in production, especially massive resources in the Arctic region.

In early 2000, as Murphy Oil, Apache (now APA Corporation), and Beau Canada announced their discovery of the Ladyfern Slave Point gas field in a remote area of Northeastern British Columbia, their achievement seemed to herald a new era of successful wildcat exploration. As word of a major discovery leaked out, many of the significant players in the industry jumped on the bandwagon. A frenzy of land purchases, drilling and pipeline construction followed. In little more than a year, production from the new fields rose to more than 700 million cubic feet (20,000,000 m^{3}) per day - and this from an area only accessible during the cold winter months.

=== Unconventional gas ===
In any given area, free-flowing, buoyancy-driven natural gas represents a very small fraction of the natural gas resources present. Unconventional gas represents possibly hundreds of times more natural gas resource than there is for conventional gas. It comes from five major sources:

1. One is shallow, biogenically derived gas in mixed sand and shale sequences. Shallow biogenic gas is considered to be an unconventional gas resource since it is not generated in the same temperature and pressure systems found in conventional hydrocarbon generation. The Milk River and Medicine Hat sands of southeastern Alberta and southwestern Saskatchewan are classic examples of this type of unconventional gas. This is the area where gas was first produced in western Canada, and it is still a major producing region. This continuously gas-producing area is the largest in the Western Canadian Sedimentary Basin.
2. Coalbed methane or coal seam methane is natural gas within the structure of coal. Special production techniques to remove this gas from its coal seam reservoir include lowering reservoir pressures rather than keeping them high. Coalbed methane knowledge has advanced rapidly. So has the development of water-free natural gas from coal in the Horseshoe Canyon Formation in Central Alberta. First commercial production only occurred in 2002, but current production is already more than 500 million cubic feet (14,000,000 m^{3}) per day.
3. Tight gas is gas in low-permeability rock. Reservoirs require artificial fracturing to enable the gas to flow. Canadian Hunter Exploration in the 1970s identified a huge gas resource in the Deep Basin of western Alberta. In this area, much of the sedimentary section is charged with natural gas. The rock can have extremely low permeability but production is not hampered by the presence of water. Horizontal drilling and hydraulic fracturing are techniques used to develop such resources. Similar gas-charged areas have been found in many parts of the world; a common term for this kind of reservoir is "basin-centred gas". The Montney Play has seen significant development in the early 2000s (decade) in the southern Peace River Country.
4. Shale gas is held in shale reservoirs. This is also a highly challenging, low-permeability resource. Large volumes of gas molecules are trapped in shales which represent one of the commonest rock types in any sedimentary sequence. Shale gas production has been pursued in the United States since the early days of the natural gas industry, and in recent years the Barnett Shale in Texas has been a tremendous success. Many companies are experimenting with shale gas production in Saskatchewan, Alberta and even in Nova Scotia, New Brunswick and Quebec. Large-scale projects are underway in northeastern British Columbia, tapping the Muskwa shales in the Horn River Basin. (see: Shale gas in Canada)
5. Gas hydrates consist of natural gas trapped in ice crystals in areas of permafrost and on the ocean floor.

In 1985, unconventional gas production received a boost when the United States introduced incentives to encourage the development of energy alternatives. This incentive advanced the technical understanding of the resources themselves and of ways to develop them. Canada has benefited from this, learning new ways to exploit her own unconventional resources.

== Complacency ==
The existence of these resources has led to complacency among consumers, who still assume they will always be supplied with gas at "affordable" prices. Developing these resources can have substantial impacts on the environment through closer well spacing, more intensive infrastructure, additional noise from compression, the challenges of water disposal, NIMBY issues, and other factors. In recent years, changes in production technology (notably horizontal drilling and more advanced systems of hydraulic fracturing or "fracking") have greatly increased shale gas production. Greater shale gas production in the United States has been an important factor in reduced Canadian exports to that country.

Consider this matter in the context that natural gas producers generally buy mineral rights from the Crown but must negotiate surface access and other land rights with their neighbours. In this environment, the chances are high that some projects will face delays as a result of public hearings - for example, as Shell and the other contenders did at the Caroline hearing. After all, those with an interest in a single land use decision could include petroleum producers, Aboriginal communities, landowners, farmers, ranchers, loggers, trappers, campers, sports and environmental groups, and others. Many conflicting interests need to be resolved.

Forecasters now commonly suggest that western Canada's conventional gas production has peaked and will continue to decline. Gaps between traditional supply and growing demand are already being filled with gas from such diverse sources as tight sands; coalbed methane; and since January 2000, frontier gas and liquids from Nova Scotia's Sable Offshore Energy Project. Other likely future sources include Mackenzie Delta gas and liquefied natural gas from abroad. This suggests higher future costs and risks, and that suggests higher-priced future energy.

== Metric conversions ==
One cubic metre of oil = 6.29 barrels. One cubic metre of natural gas = 35.49 cubic feet. One kilopascal = 1% of atmospheric pressure (near sea level).

Canada's oil measure, the cubic metre, is unique in the world. It is metric in the sense that it uses metres, but it is based on volume so that Canadian units can be easily converted into barrels. In the rest of the metric world, the standard for measuring oil is the tonne. The advantage of the latter measure is that it reflects oil quality. In general, lower grade oils are heavier.

== See also ==
- Energy policy of Canada
- Natural gas processing
- Natural gas in Canada
