= History of the petroleum industry in Canada =

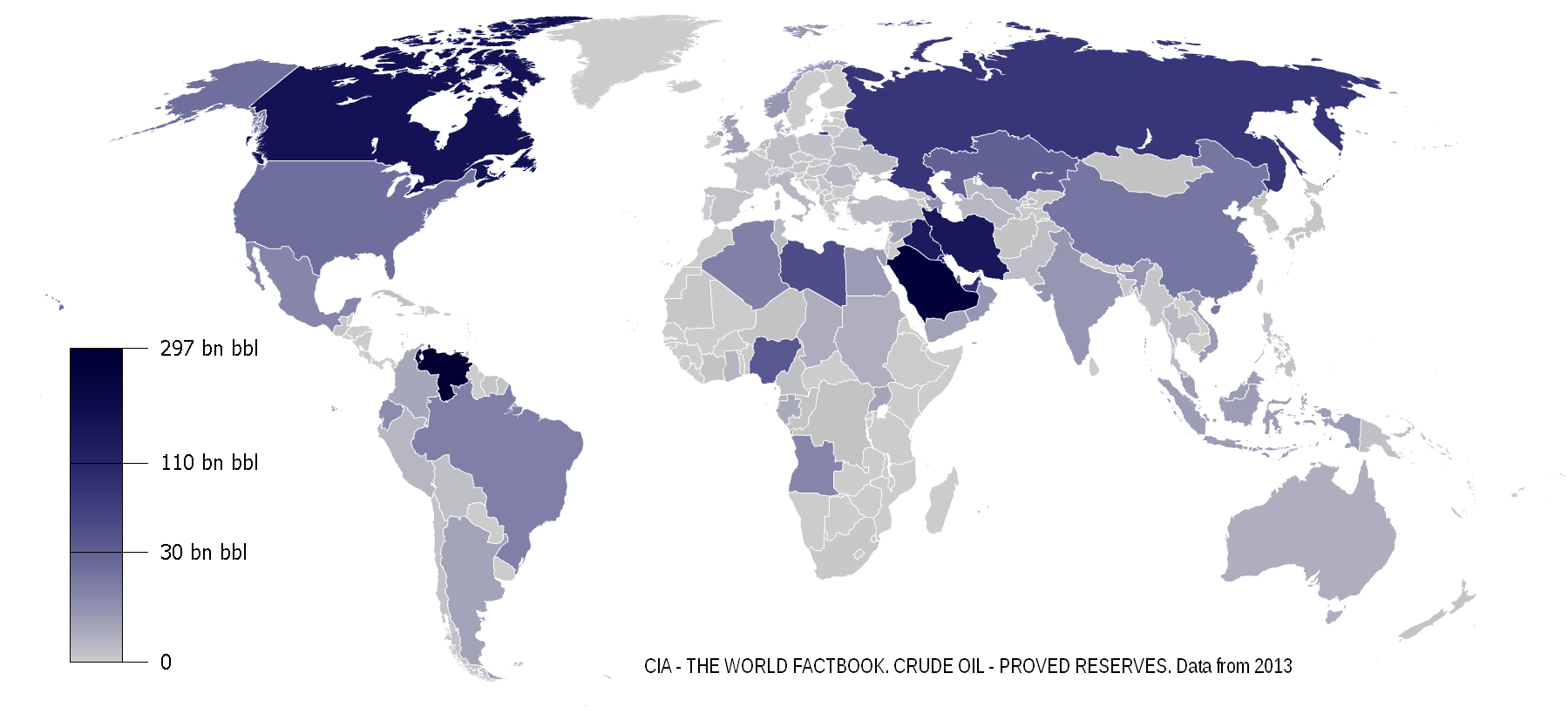
Proved world oil reserves, 2009

The Canadian petroleum industry arose in parallel with that of the United States. Because of Canada's unique geography, geology, resources and patterns of settlement, however, it developed in different ways. The evolution of the petroleum sector has been a key factor in the history of Canada, and helps illustrate how the country became quite distinct from her neighbour to the south.

Although the conventional oil and gas industry in western Canada is mature, the country's Arctic and offshore petroleum resources are mostly in early stages of exploration and development. Canada became a natural gas-producing giant in the late 1950s and is second, after Russia, in exports; the country also is home to the world's largest natural gas liquids extraction facilities. The industry started constructing its vast pipeline networks in the 1950s, thus beginning to develop domestic and international markets in a big way.

Despite billions of dollars of investment, its bitumen—especially within the Athabasca oil sands—is still only a partially exploited resource. By 2025 this and other unconventional oil resources—the northern and offshore frontiers and heavy crude oil resources in the West—could place Canada in the top ranks among the world's oil producing and exporting nations. In a 2004 reassessment of global resources, the United States' EIA put Canadian oil reserves second; only Saudi Arabia has greater proved reserves. In 2014, the EIA now ranks Canada as third in World Oil Reserves at around 175 billion barrels (27.8 km^{3}), while Saudi Arabia is 2nd with around 268 billion barrels (42.6 km^{3}) and Venezuela is ranked first with around 297 billion barrels (47.2 km^{3}) of reserves.

Many stories surrounding the petroleum industry's early development are colourful. The gathering oilpatch involved rugged adventurers, the occasional fraud, important innovations and, in the end, world-class success. Canadian petroleum production is now a vital part of the national economy and an essential element of world supply.

== Early origins ==
In his blog entitled "Canadian Oil and Gas: The First 100 Years", Peter McKenzie-Brown said that the "early uses of petroleum go back thousands of years. But while people have known about and used petroleum for centuries, Charles Nelson Tripp was the first Canadian to recover the substance for commercial use. The year was 1851; the place, Enniskillen Township, near Sarnia, in present-day Ontario (at that time Canada West). It was there that Tripp started dabbling in the mysterious gum beds near Black Creek. This led to incorporation of the first oil company in Canada."

"Parliament chartered the International Mining and Manufacturing Company, with C.N. Tripp as president, on December 18, 1854. The charter empowered the company to explore for asphalt beds and oil and salt springs, and to manufacture oils, naphtha paints, burning fluids."

"International Mining and Manufacturing was not a financial success, but Tripp's asphalt received an honourable mention for excellence at the Paris Universal Exhibition in 1855. Several factors contributed to the downfall of the operation. Lack of roads in the area made the movement of machinery and equipment to the site extremely difficult. And after every heavy rain the area turned into a swamp and the gum beds made drainage extremely slow. This added to the difficulty of distributing finished products."

=== North American first ===
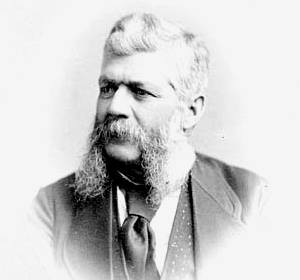
James Miller Williams in 1873 (Library and Archives Canada)

According to Peter McKenzie-Brown, "[w]hen James Miller Williams became interested and visited the site in 1856, Tripp unloaded his hopes, his dreams and the properties of his company, saving for himself a spot on the payroll as landman. The former carriage builder formed J.M. Williams & Company in 1857 to develop the Tripp properties. Besides asphalt, he began producing kerosene." "Stagnant, algae-ridden surface water lay almost everywhere. To secure better drinking water, Williams dug (rather than drilled) a well a few yards down an incline from his plant." In 1858 at a depth of 14 feet (4.3 m) the well struck oil. It became the first commercial oil well in North America, remembered as the Williams No. 1 well at Oil Springs, Ontario. The Sarnia Observer and Lambton Advertiser, quoting from the Woodstock Sentinel, published on page two on August 5, 1858: It was 12 years after drilling the first oil well in Baku settlement (Bibi-Heybat) in 1846 on Apsheron peninsula.

An important discovery has just been made in the Township of Enniskillen. A short time since, a party, in digging a well at the edge of the bed of Bitumen, struck upon a vein of oil, which combining with the earth forms the Bitumen.

'Some historians challenge Canada's claim to North America's first oil field, arguing that Pennsylvania's famous Drake Well was the continent's first. But there is evidence to support Williams, not least of which is that the Drake well did not come into production until August 28, 1859. The controversial point might be that Williams found oil above bedrock while "Colonel" Edwin Drake's well located oil within a bedrock reservoir."

"We do not know exactly when Williams abandoned his Oil Springs refinery and transferred his operations to Hamilton. He was certainly operating there by 1860, however. Spectator advertisements offered coal oil for sale at 16 cents per gallon for quantities from 4,000 US gallons (15,000 L) to 100,000 US gallons (380,000 L)."

By 1859 Williams owned 800 acres of land in Oil Springs. Williams reincorporated in 1860 as the Canadian Oil Company. His company produced oil, refined it and marketed refined products. That mix of operations qualify Canadian Oil as the world's first integrated oil company.

"Exploration in the Lambton county backwoods quickened with the first flowing well in 1860: Previous wells had relied on hand pumps. The first gusher erupted on January 16, 1862, when struck oil at 158 feet [48 m]. For a week the oil gushed unchecked at levels reported as high as 3,000 barrels per day [480 m^{3}/d], eventually coating the distant waters of Lake St. Clair with a black film." There is historical controversy concerning whether it was John Shaw or another oil driller named Hugh Nixon Shaw who drilled this oil gusher; the newspaper article cited below identifies John Shaw.

News of the gusher spread quickly and was reported in the Hamilton Times four days later:

I have just time to mention that to-day at half past eleven o'clock, a.m., Mr. John Shaw, from Kingston, C. W., tapped a vein of oil in his well, at a depth of one hundred and fifty-eight feet in the rock, which filled the surface well, (forty-five feet to the rock) and the conductors [sic] in the course of fifteen minutes, and immediately commenced flowing. It will hardly be credited, but nevertheless such is the case, that the present enormous flow of oil cannot be estimated at less than two thousand barrels per day, (twenty-four hours), of pure oil, and the quantity increasing every hour. I saw three men in the course of one hour, fill fifty barrels from the flow of oil, which is running away in every direction; the flat presenting the appearance of a sea of oil. The excitement is intense, and hundreds are rushing from every quarter to see this extraordinary well.

"Following Williams' example, practically every significant producer in the infancy of the oil business became his own refiner. Seven refineries were operating in Petrolia, Ontario in 1864 and 20 in Oil Springs - together, they processed about 80 cubic metres of oil per day." There were also refineries in Wyoming, where the Great Western Railway (later Grand Trunk Railway) could take oil to market.

"In 1865 oil was selling for $70 per cubic metre ($11.13 per barrel). But the fields of Ontario delivered too much too quickly, and by 1867 the price had dropped to $3.15 per cubic metre ($0.50 per barrel). In 1866 the oil industry in Oil Springs came to an abrupt standstill and the population plummeted overnight: by 1870, Oil Springs and Bothwell were both dead fields, but other booms followed as drillers tapped deeper formations and new fields." Many local drillers moved several kilometers north to Petrolia, where operations began in earnest after the Oil Springs boom subsided.

"Although the industry had a promising start in the east, Ontario's status as an important oil producer did not last long. Canada became a net importer of oil during the 1880s. Dependence on neighbouring Ohio as a crude oil supplier increased after the automobile rolled into Canada in 1898."

=== Canadian drillers ===
According to McKenzie-Brown, "Canadians developed petroleum expertise in those early days. The Canadian "oil man" or driller became valued the world over."

"Petrolia drillers developed the Canadian pole-tool method of drilling which was especially useful in new fields where rock formations were a matter for conjecture. The Canadian technique was different from the American cable-tool method. Now obsolete, cable-tool drilling uses drilling tools suspended from a cable which the driller paid out as the well deepened."

"Canada's pole-tool rig used rods or poles linked together, with a drilling bit fixed to the end of this primitive drilling "string." Black-ash rods were the norm in early Petrolia. Iron rods came later. Like the cable tool system, pole-tool drilling used the weight of the drill string pounding into the ground from a wooden derrick to make hole."

"The record is not complete enough to show all the locations Canadians helped to drill. However, Petrolia drillers unquestionably helped drill for oil in Java, Peru, Turkey, Egypt, Russia, Venezuela, Persia, Romania, Austria and Germany. One of the best-known Canadian drilling pioneers was William McGarvey. McGarvey acquired oil properties in Galicia (now part of Poland) and amassed a large fortune - then saw his properties destroyed when Russian and Austrian armies swept across the land during the First World War."

McKenzie-Brown said in 2008 that Canadian drillers moved to "far away places to practise their widely respected skills."

=== Eastern natural gas ===
McKenzie-Brown said that the "natural gas industry was also born in eastern Canada. Reports from around 1820 tell of youngsters at Lake Ainslie, Nova Scotia, amusing themselves by driving sticks into the ground, pulling them out, then lighting the escaping natural gas."

"In 1859 an oil explorer found a natural gas seep near Moncton, New Brunswick. Dr. H.C. Tweedle found both oil and gas in what became the Dover field, but water seepage prevented production of these wells."

"An offshoot of the oil drilling boom was the discovery of gas containing poisonous hydrogen sulfide ("sour" gas) near Port Colborne, Ontario. That 1866 discovery marked the first of many gas fields found later in the southwestern part of the province."

"Eugene Coste, a young Paris-educated geologist who became the father of Canada's natural gas industry, brought in the first producing gas well in Essex County, Ontario, in 1889. Canada first exported natural gas in 1891 from the Bertie-Humberstone field in Welland County to Buffalo, New York. Gas was later exported to Detroit from the Essex field through a 20-centimetre pipeline under the Detroit river. In 1897, the pipeline stretched the Essex gas supply to its limit with the extension of exports to Toledo, Ohio. This prompted the Ontario government to revoke the licence for the pipeline. And in 1907 the province passed a law prohibiting the export of natural gas and electricity."

"In 1909, New Brunswick's first successful gas well came in at Stoney Creek near Moncton. This field still supplies customers in Moncton, although the city now has a propane air plant to augment the limited natural gas supply."

"The year 1911 saw a milestone for the natural gas industry when three companies using Ontario's Tilbury gas field joined to form Union Gas Company of Canada, Limited. In 1924, Union Gas was the first company to use the new Seaboard or Koppers process to remove poisonous hydrogen sulfide from Tilbury gas." Union became one of the largest corporations in Canada before its acquisition by Duke Energy, a US firm.

== Westward move ==
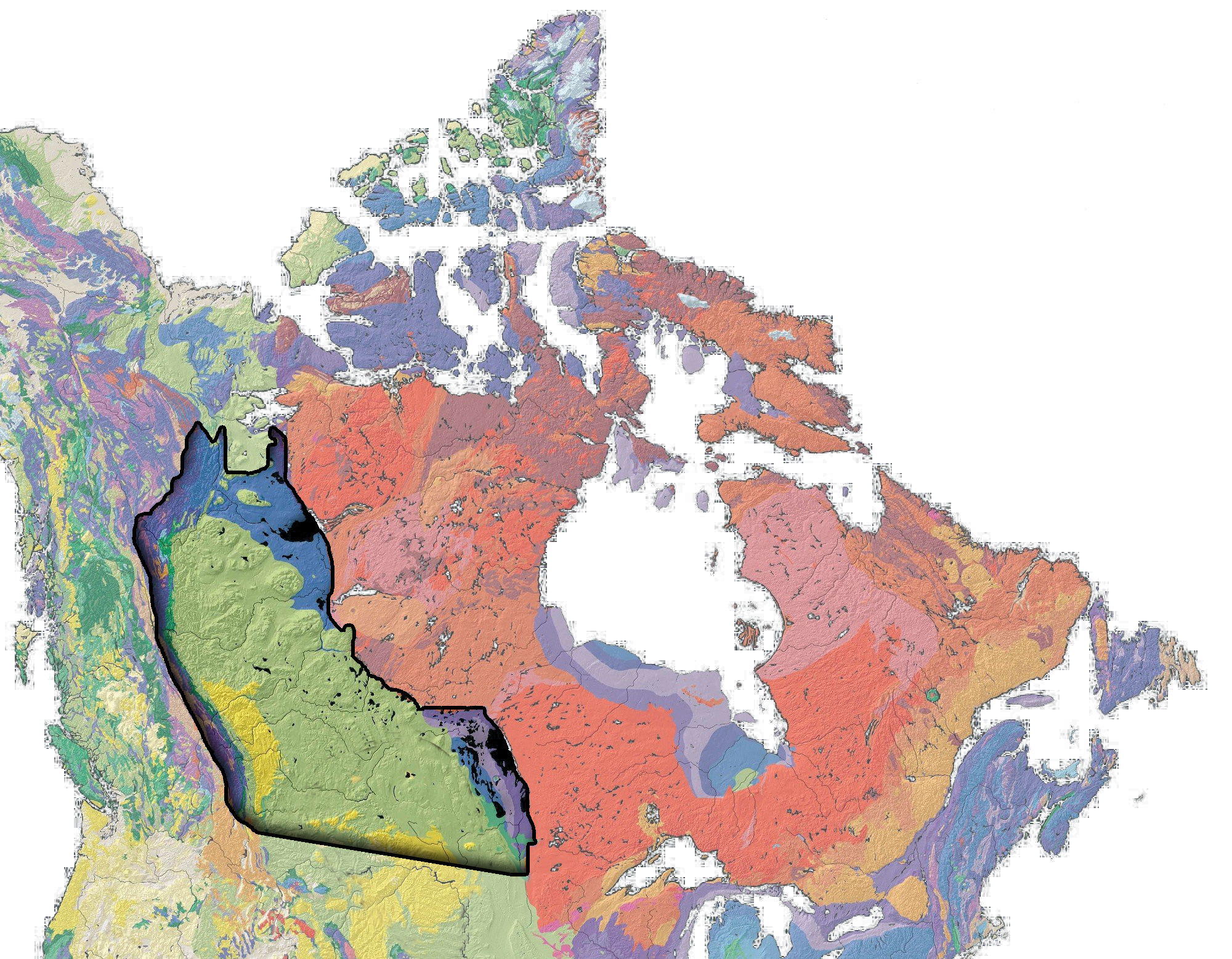
Geological map of Canada The bulk of oil and gas production occurs in the Western Canadian Sedimentary Basin (mostly light green), which stretches from southwestern Manitoba to northeastern British Columbia. Nearly one and a half million square kilometres in area, the basin also covers most of Alberta, the southern half of Saskatchewan and the southwest corner of the Northwest Territories.

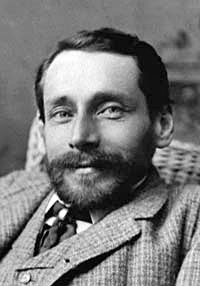
George M. Dawson in May 1885. (National Archives of Canada)

"Those were the early days in Canada's petroleum industry. The cradle was in the east, but the industry only began to come of age with discoveries in western Canada, notably Alberta," according to McKenzie-Brown. There, the Western Canadian Sedimentary Basin is at its most prolific. Alberta's first recorded natural gas find came in 1883 from a well at CPR siding No. 8 at Langevin, near Medicine Hat. This well was one of a series drilled at scattered points along the railway to get water for the Canadian Pacific Railway's steam-driven locomotives. The unexpected gas flow caught fire and destroyed the drilling rig."

"This find prompted Dr. George M. Dawson of the Geological Survey of Canada to make a notable prediction. Noting that the rock formations penetrated in this well were common in western Canada, he prophesied correctly that the territory would some day produce large volumes of natural gas."

"A well drilled near Medicine Hat in 1890 - this time in search of coal - also flowed natural gas. The find prompted town officials to approach the CPR with a view to drilling deeper wells for gas. The resulting enterprise led to the discovery in 1904 of the Medicine Hat gas sand, which is now recognized as a source of unconventional gas. Later, that field went on production to serve the city, the first in Alberta to have gas service. When Rudyard Kipling travelled across Canada in 1907, he remarked that Medicine Hat had "all Hell for a basement.""

"In northern Alberta, the Dominion Government began a drilling program to help define the region's resources. Using a rig brought from Toronto, in 1893 contractor A.W. Fraser began drilling for liquid oil at Athabasca. He abandoned the well in 1894." "In 1897 Fraser moved the rig to Pelican Rapids, also in northern Alberta. There it struck gas at 250 metres (820 ft). But the well blew wild, flowing uncontrolled for 21 years. It was not until 1918 that a crew led by A.W. Dingman succeeded in killing the well."

"Dingman, who played an important role in the industry's early years, began providing natural gas service in Calgary through the Calgary Natural Gas Company. After receiving the franchise in 1908, he drilled a successful well in east Calgary on the Walker estate (a well which continued producing until 1948). He then laid pipe from the well to the Calgary Brewing and Malting Company, which began using the gas on April 10, 1910."

"The earliest efforts to develop western Canadian oil were those of Kootenai Brown. This colourful character - a frontiersman with an Eton and Oxford education - was probably Alberta's first homesteader." In 1874, Brown filed the following affidavit with Donald Thompson, the resident solicitor at Pincher Creek:

I was engaged as a guide and packer by the eminent geologist Dr. George M. Dawson, and he asked me if I had seen oil seepages in that area, and if I did see them, would I be able to recognize them. He then went into a learned discussion on the subject of petroleum. Subsequently some Stoney Indians came to my camp and I mixed up some molasses and coal oil and gave it to them to drink, and told them if they found anything that tasted or smelled like that to let me know. Sometime afterwards they came back and told me about the seepages at Cameron Brook.

"In 1901, John Lineham of Okotoks organized the Rocky Mountain Drilling Company. In 1902 he drilled the first oil exploration well in Alberta on the site of these seepages (now in Waterton Lakes National Park). Despite a small recovery of 34° API sweet oil, neither this well nor seven later exploration attempts resulted in production." The site is now a National Historic Site of Canada.

"In 1909, exploration activity shifted to Bow Island in south central Alberta, where a natural gas discovery launched Canada's western gas industry. The same Eugene Coste who had found gas in Ohio and again in southern Ontario drilled the discovery well, Bow Island No. 1 (better known as "Old Glory"). Pipelines soon transported Bow Island gas to Medicine Hat, Lethbridge and Calgary, which used the fuel for heat and light. Eugene Coste became the founder of the Canadian Western Natural Gas Company when he merged the Calgary Natural Gas Company, Calgary Gas Company and his Prairie Fuel Company in August 1911."

=== Turner Valley ===
"In early 1914, oil fever swept Calgary and other parts of southern Alberta. Investors lined up outside makeshift brokerage houses to get in on exploration activity triggered by the May 14, 1914 discovery of wet gas and oil at Turner Valley, southwest of Calgary." "Reportedly, in one 24-hour period, investors and promoters formed more than 500 "oil companies." "Incorporated a year earlier, the Calgary Stock Exchange was unable to control some of the unscrupulous practices that relieved many Albertans of their savings."

"The discovery well that set off this speculative flurry belonged to the Calgary Petroleum Products Company, an enterprise formed by W.S. Herron, William Elder and A.W. Dingman. Named Dingman No. 1 after the partner in charge of drilling, the well produced natural gas dripping with condensate, sometimes referred to as naphtha. Stripped from the gas, this hydrocarbon mixture was pure enough to burn in automobiles without refining; it became known as "skunk" gasoline because of its distinctive odour."

Pioneered in Turner Valley, natural gas liquids extraction eventually became an important Canadian industry in its own right, as the story of its development illustrates.

"The Dingman well and its successors were really "wet" natural gas wells rather than true oil wells. The high expectations raised by the initial discovery gave way to disappointment within a few years. Relatively small volumes of liquids flowed from the successful wells. By 1917, the Calgary City Directory listed only 21 "oil mining companies" compared with 226 in 1914."

"Drilling continued in Turner Valley, however, and in 1924 came another significant discovery. The Calgary Petroleum Products Company, reorganized as Royalite Oil Company, drilled into Paleozoic limestone. The well blew out at 1,180 metres (3,870 ft)."

"The blowout at Royalite No. 4 was one of the most spectacular in Alberta's history. Initially flowing at 200,000 cubic metres per day, the flow rate increased to some 620,000 cubic metres per day when the well was shut in. The shut in pressure continued to rise and, when the gauge read 1,150 pounds per square inch (7,900 kPa), the drillers ran for their lives. In 20 minutes, 939 metres (3,081 ft) of 8 inches (20 cm) and 3,450 ft (1,050 m) of 6 inches (15 cm) pipe - together weighing 85 tonnes - rose to the top of the derrick. The well blew wild, caught fire, and destroyed the entire rig. The fire blazed for 21 days. Finally, wild well control experts from Oklahoma used a dynamite explosion to blow away the flames. They then applied the combined steam flow of seven boilers to keep the torch from lighting again."

"Unknown to the explorers of the day, these wells extracted naphtha from the natural gas cap over Turner Valley's oilfield. After two years of off-and-on drilling, in 1936 the Royalite No. 1 well finally drilled into the principal oil reservoir at more than 2,500 metres (8,200 ft)."

"This well, which established Turner Valley as Canada's first major oil field and the largest in the emerging British Commonwealth, used innovative financing. Promoters ordinarily sold shares in a company to finance new drilling programs, but in the Depression money for shares was hard to come by. Instead, R.A. Brown, George M. Bell and J.W. Moyer put together an enterprise called Turner Valley Royalties. That company offered a percentage share of production (a "royalty") to those willing to put money into the long-shot venture."

"Recoverable oil reserves from the Turner Valley field were probably about 19 million cubic metres. Although locals boasted at the time that it was "the biggest oil field in the British Empire", Turner Valley was not a large field by later standards. (By way of comparison, the Pembina field in central Alberta - Canada's largest - had recoverable reserves of about 100 million cubic metres.) But besides being an important source of oil supply for the then-small market in western Canada, the field had an important long-term impact. It helped develop petroleum expertise in Canada's west, and it established Calgary as Canada's oil and gas capital."

=== Waste and conservation ===
"Enormous waste of natural gas was a dubious distinction that Turner Valley claimed for many years. Royalite had a monopoly on sales to Canadian Western Natural Gas Company, so other producers could not sell their gas. But all the producers wanted to cash in on the natural gas liquids for which markets were growing. So the common practice became to pass the gas through separators, then flare it off. This greatly reduced the pressure on the oil reservoir, reducing the amount of recoverable oil. But the size of the problem was not clear until the oil column was later discovered."

"The flares were visible in the sky for miles around. Many of these were in a small ravine known to locals as Hell's Half Acre. Because of the presence of the flares, the grass stayed green year-round and migrating birds wintered in their warmth." A newspaper man from Manchester, England, described the place with these florid words:

... Seeing it you can imagine what Dante's inferno is like ... a rushing torrent of flame, shooting 40 feet (12 m) high ... a ruddy glow to be seen for 50 miles (80 km) ... most awe-inspiring spectacle ... men have seen the hosts of hell rising ... the titanic monster glowering from the depths of Hades ...

While the flaring continued, the business community seriously discussed ways to market the gas. For example, in early 1929 W.S. Herron, a Turner Valley pioneer, publicly promoted the idea of a pipeline to Winnipeg. At about the same time, an American company made application for a franchise to distribute natural gas to Regina. The Bank of North Dakota offered to buy 1.4 million cubic metres per day.

"By early 1930, there was talk of a pipeline from Turner Valley to Toronto. Estimates showed that gas delivery to Toronto would cost $2.48 per thousand cubic metres. A parliamentary committee looked into ways to force waste gas down old wells, set up carbon black plants or export the gas to the United States. Another proposal called for the production of liquefied methane."

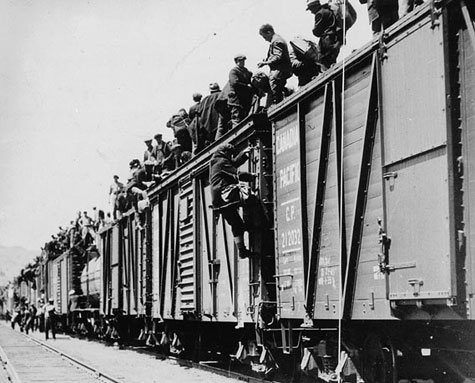
Strikers from unemployment relief camps climbing on boxcars to protest social conditions through the On-to-Ottawa Trek, 1935

"The Depression, however, had already gripped Canada, which may have been more severely affected than any other country in the world. Capital investment became less and less attractive and drilling at Turner Valley ground to a halt as the economic situation worsened."

"The federal government owned the mineral rights not held by the Canadian Pacific Railway, the Calgary & Edmonton Corporation, or individual homesteads. The government tried to curb the flaring of gas, but legal difficulties made its efforts of little avail. One federal conservation measure succeeded, however. On August 4, 1930, began operations to store surplus Turner Valley gas in the depleted Bow Island field."

"An earlier effort to control waste resulted in an Order in Council made on April 26, 1922, prohibiting offset drilling closer than 70 metres (230 ft) from any lease boundary. Keeping wells spaced away from each other, as this regulation did, prevents too rapid depletion of a field."

After lengthy negotiations, the "federal government transferred ownership of natural resources to the provinces effective October 1, 1930. Soon after, the Alberta government enacted legislation to regulate oil and gas wells." In October 1931, the provincial Legislature passed a bill (based on a report by a provincial advisory committee) to control the Turner Valley situation. While most operators supported this act, one independent operator, Spooner Oils Ltd., launched legal proceedings to have the act declared ultra vires; this was successful in a Supreme Court of Canada judgement handed down 3 October 1933. Alberta asked Ottawa to pass legislation confirming the provincial law; the federal government, however, shrugged off the request saying natural resources were under provincial jurisdiction."

"During 1932, the newly created Turner Valley Gas Conservation Board proposed cutting production in half and unitizing the field to reduce waste. But the producers could not reach agreement on this issue, and the idea fell by the wayside. And so legal wrangling tied up any real conservation measures until 1938. In that year, the federal government confirmed the province's right to enact laws to conserve natural resources."

"With this backing, in July 1938 the province set up the Alberta Petroleum and Natural Gas Conservation Board (today known as the Energy Resources Conservation Board). New unitization rules limited well spacing to about 40 acres (16 ha) per well. The board also reduced oil production from the field. This reduced the flaring of natural gas, but it came only after the waste of an estimated 28 billion cubic metres. The lessons of Turner Valley made an impression around the world as the need for conservation and its impact on ultimate recovery became better understood. Countries framing their first petroleum laws have often used the Alberta legislation as a model."

"Besides contributing to conservation, solving Turner Valley's technical challenges with innovative technology also helped earn the field a place in early oil and gas history. Uncorrected, drilling holes wandered 22 degrees or more off course. As the field's high-pressure gas expanded, it cooled rapidly freezing production equipment. This complicated the production process. Other problems involved external corrosion, casing failures, sulfide stress corrosion cracking, corrosion inside oil storage tanks, and the cold winters."

"Early drilling was done by wooden cable tool drilling rigs which pounded a hole into the ground. These monsters ruled the drilling scene until the mid-1920s. Rotary drilling (which has since replaced cable tool drilling) and diamond coring made their appearance in Turner Valley in 1925. Nitro-shooting came in 1927 to enhance production at McLeod No. 2. Acidizing made its Canadian debut in 1936 at Model No. 3. Scrubbing gas to extract hydrogen sulfide started in 1925. Field repressurization began in 1944 and water flooding started in 1948."

"Only months after Union Gas completed a scrubbing facility for its Tilbury gas in Ontario, in 1924 Royalite began sweetening gas from the sour Royalite #4 well through a similar plant. This process removed H_{2}S from the gas, but did not extract the sulfur as a chemical element. This development waited until 1952, when a sulfur recovery plant at Turner Valley began producing raw sulfur."

"Turner Valley oil production peaked in 1942, partly because the Oil and Gas Conservation Board increased allowable production as part of the Second World War war effort. During that period exploration results elsewhere in western Canada were disappointing. The only significant discoveries were small heavy oil fields. Natural gas finds were mostly uneconomic, since Western Canada's few gas pipelines were small and already well supplied."

=== Small discoveries elsewhere ===
Natural flows of oil and gas led to the successful early exploration in Alberta's foothills. Those discoveries were not unique, however. Early settlers frequently found oil and gas seeps in Western Canada, generally near rivers, streams and creeks.

At Rolla, British Columbia, for example, such an observation caught Imperial Oil's attention, and in 1922 the company financed exploration to investigate. A well was drilled and oil and gas found. However, the remoteness of the Peace River Country from market and the lack of good transport hindered commercial exploitation of the area. Today, however, Northeastern British Columbia is an active exploration and production region within the Western Canada Sedimentary Basin. Commercial development dates from the 1950s.

Many small wells were successfully drilled in Western Canada in the pre-war years, but prior to the Second World War there were no big oil discoveries outside Turner Valley.

== Leduc ==
That changed in 1947, when Imperial Oil discovered light oil just south of Edmonton. Imperial's success was inspired by their much earlier discovery at Norman Wells in the Northwest Territories. The link was that there appeared to be Devonian reefs in Alberta. At the Norman Wells discovery, Imperial had located just such a reservoir in the 1920s.

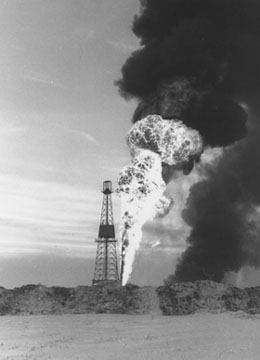
Leduc #1 well; released under GNU Free Documentation License.

During the 1930s and early 1940s, oil companies tried unsuccessfully to find replacement for declining Turner Valley reserves. According to legend, Imperial Oil had drilled 133 dry wells in Alberta and Saskatchewan, although the records show that many of those wells were natural gas discoveries that were uneconomic at the time.

In 1946, the company decided on one last drilling program from east to west in Alberta. The wells would be "wildcats" - exploratory wells drilled in search of new fields. The first drill site was Leduc No. 1 in a field on the farm of Mike Turta, 15 kilometres west of Leduc and about 50 kilometres south of Edmonton. Located on a weak seismic anomaly, the well was a rank wildcat. No drilling of any kind had taken place within an 80-kilometre radius.

Drilling started on November 20, 1946. It continued through a winter that was "bloody cold," according to members of the rig crew. At first the crew thought the well was a gas discovery, but there were signs of something more. At 1,530 metres (5,020 ft), drilling sped up and the first bit samples showed free oil in dolomite, a good reservoir rock. After coring, oil flowed to the surface during a drill stem test at 1,544 metres (5,066 ft).

Imperial Oil decided to bring the well in with some fanfare at 10 o'clock in the morning of February 13, 1947. The company invited the mayor of Edmonton and other dignitaries. The night before the ceremony, however, swabbing equipment broke down. The crew laboured to repair it all night. But 10:00 a.m. passed and no oil flowed. Many of the invited guests left.

Finally by 4:00 pm the crew were able to get the well to flow. The chilled onlookers, now numbering only about 100, saw a spectacular column of smoke and fire beside the derrick as the crew flared the first gas and oil. Alberta mines minister N.E. Tanner turned the valve to start the oil flowing (at an initial rate of about 155 cubic metres per day), and the Canadian oil industry moved into the modern era. This well marked the discovery of what became the Leduc/Woodbend field, which has since produced about 50 million cubic metres (more than 300 million barrels) of oil.

Imperial lost no time. On February 12 the company had started drilling Leduc No. 2, about three kilometres southwest of No. 1, trying to extend the producing formation. But nothing showed up at that level and company officials argued over how to proceed. One group proposed abandoning the well, instead drilling a direct offset to No. 1; another group wanted to continue drilling No. 2 into a deep stratigraphic test. But drilling continued. On May 10 at 1,657 metres (5,436 ft), No. 2 struck the much bigger Devonian reef, which later turned out to be the most prolific geological formation in Alberta, the Leduc Formation.

Leduc No. 1 stopped producing in 1974 after the production of some 50,300 cubic metres (320,000 barrels) of oil and 9 million cubic metres (320 million cubic feet) of natural gas. On November 1, 1989, Esso Resources (the exploration and production arm of Imperial) began producing the field as a gas reservoir.

=== Geological diversity ===
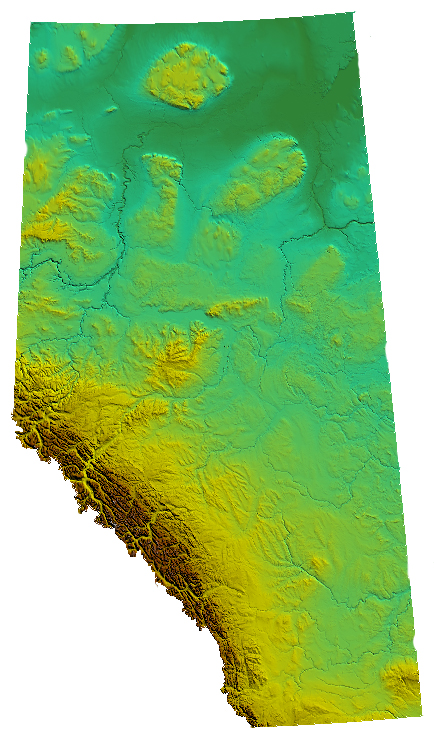
A geographical map of Alberta, which overlies the most prolific petroleum-producing sedimentary rock of the Western Canada Basin

The Leduc discoveries put Alberta on the world petroleum map. News of the finds spread quickly, due in large part to a spectacular blowout in the early days of the development of this field. In March 1948, drillers on the Atlantic Leduc #3 well lost mud circulation in the top of the reef, and the well blew out.

In one journalist's words,"The well had barely punched into the main producing reservoir a mile below the surface when a mighty surge of pressure shot the drilling mud up through the pipe and 150 feet (46 m) into the air. As the ground shook and a high-pitched roar issued from the well, the mud was followed by a great, dirty plume of oil and gas that splattered the snow-covered ground. Drillers pumped several tons of drilling mud down the hole, and after thirty-eight hours the wild flow was sealed off, but not for long. Some 2,800 feet (850 m) below the surface, the drill pipe had broken off, and through this break the pressure of the reservoir forced oil and gas into shallower formations. As the pressure built up, the oil and gas were forced to the surface through crevices and cracks. Geysers of mud, oil, and gas spouted out of the ground in hundreds of craters over a 10-acre (40,000 m^{2}) area around the well." Atlantic #3 eventually caught fire, and the crew worked frantically for 59 hours to snuff out the blaze.

It took six months, two relief wells and the injection of 160,000 cubic metres of river water to bring the well under control, an achievement which the crews celebrated on September 9, 1948. Cleanup efforts recovered almost 180,000 cubic metres of oil in a series of ditches and gathering pools. The size of the blowout and the cleanup operation added to the legend. By the time Atlantic #3 was back under control, the whole world knew from newsreels and photo features of the blowout that the words "oil" and "Alberta" were inseparable.

Exploration boomed. By 1950, Alberta was one of the world's exploration hot spots, and seismic activity grew until 1953. After the Leduc strike, it became clear that Devonian reefs could be prolific oil reservoirs, and exploration concentrated on the search for similar structures. A series of major discoveries followed, and the industry began to appreciate the diversity of geological structures in the province that could contain oil. Early reef discoveries included Redwater in 1948, Golden Spike in 1949, Wizard Lake, Fenn Big Valley and Bonnie Glen in 1951 and Westerose in 1952. In 1953, Mobil Oil made a discovery near Drayton Valley, in a sandstone formation. By 1956, more than 1,500 development wells dotted what became the Pembina oil field (the largest field in western Canada) with hardly a dry hole among them, and the oil bearing Cardium Formation was dubbed the Cardium Freeway. The Swan Hills field, discovered in 1957, exploited a carbonate rock formation.

Before Leduc, the petroleum industry had long been familiar with the oil sand deposits. A number of companies were already producing heavy oil in Alberta and Saskatchewan. The Turner Valley petroleum reservoirs near Calgary had been on production for nearly 35 years, and the Devonian reef at Norman Wells in the Northwest Territories had been discovered a quarter of a century earlier.

In the decade after Leduc, the industry identified many more reservoir types, including those at Daly, Manitoba in 1951, at Midale, Saskatchewan in 1953 and at Clarke Lake, B.C. in 1956. And in the years since, the sector has found many more petroleum traps in the Western Canada Basin, especially within Alberta's borders. The region has great geological diversity.

== Foreign interest ==
At its recent peak in 1973, more than 78 per cent of Canadian oil and gas production was under foreign ownership and more than 90 per cent of oil and gas production companies were under foreign control, mostly American. It spurred the National Energy Program under the Trudeau government.

== Pipeline networks ==
In 1853, a small gas transmission line in Quebec established Canada as a leader in pipeline construction. A 25-kilometre length of cast-iron pipe moved natural gas to Trois-Rivières, Quebec, to light the streets. It was probably the longest pipeline in the world at the time. Canada also boasted the world's first oil pipeline when, in 1862, a line connected the Petrolia oilfield to Sarnia, Ontario. In 1895, natural gas began flowing to the United States from Ontario's Essex field through a 20-centimetre pipeline laid under the Detroit River.

In Western Canada, Eugene Coste built the first important pipeline in 1912. The 274-kilometre natural gas line connected the Bow Island gas field to consumers in Calgary. Canada's debut in northern pipeline building came during World War II when the short-lived Canol line delivered oil from Norman Wells to Whitehorse (964 kilometres), with additional supply lines to Fairbanks and Skagway, Alaska, USA, and to Watson Lake, Yukon. Wartime priorities assured the expensive pipeline's completion in 1944 and its abandonment in 1946.

By 1947, only three Canadian oil pipelines moved product to market. One transported oil from Turner Valley to Calgary. A second moved imported crude from coastal Maine to Montreal while the third brought American mid-continent oil into Ontario. But the Leduc strike and subsequent discoveries in Alberta created an opportunity for pipeline building on a grander scale. As reserves increased, producers clamored for markets. With its population density and an extensive refining system that relied on the United States and the Caribbean for crude oil, Ontario was an excellent prospect. The west coast offered another logical choice - closer still, although separated from the oilfields by the daunting Rocky Mountains. The industry pursued these opportunities vigorously.

=== Crude oil arteries ===
Construction of the Interprovincial Pipeline system from Alberta to Central Canada began in 1949 with surveys and procurement. Field construction of the Edmonton/Regina/Superior (Wisconsin) leg began early in 1950 and concluded just 150 days later. The line began moving oil from Edmonton to the Great Lakes, a distance of 1,800 kilometres, before the end of the year. In 1953, the company extended the system to Sarnia, Ontario, in 1957 to Toronto. Other additions have extended the pipe to Montreal, Chicago and even Wood River in southern Illinois. The Interprovincial crude oil pipeline (now part of Enbridge Inc.) was the longest oil pipeline in the world when it was first constructed; the longest oil pipeline is now the Druzhba pipeline from Siberia. Until the completion of the TransCanada gas pipeline, it was also the longest pipeline in the world.

The IPL line fundamentally changed the pricing of Alberta oil to make it sensitive to international rather than regional factors. The wellhead price reflected the price of oil at Sarnia, less pipeline tolls for shipping it there. IPL is by far the longest crude oil pipeline in the western hemisphere. Looping, or constructing additional lines beside the original, expanded the Interprovincial system and allowed its extension into the American Midwest and to upstate New York. In 1976, it was 3,680 kilometres through an extension to Montreal. Although it helped assure security of supply in the 1970s, the extension became a threat to Canadian oil producers after deregulation in 1985. With Montreal refineries using cheaper imported oil, there was concern within the industry that a proposal to use the line to bring foreign oil into Sarnia might undermine traditional markets for Western Canadian petroleum.

The oil supply situation on the North American continent grew critical during the Korean War and helped enable construction by Trans Mountain Oil Pipe Line Company of a transmission facility from Edmonton to Vancouver and, later, to the Seattle area. Oil first moved through the 1,200-kilometre, $93 million system in 1953. The rugged terrain made the Trans Mountain line an extraordinary engineering accomplishment. It crossed the Rockies, the mountains of central British Columbia, and 98 streams and rivers. Where it crosses under the Fraser River into Vancouver at Port Mann, 700 metres (2,300 ft) of pipe lie buried nearly 5 metres (16 ft) below the river bed. At its highest point, the pipeline is 1,200 metres (3,900 ft) above sea level.

To support these major pipelines, the industry gradually developed a complex network of feeder lines in the three most westerly provinces. A historic addition to this system was the 866-kilometre Norman Wells pipeline, which was in effect an extension of the Interprovincial line. This pipeline accompanied the expansion and water flooding of the oilfield, and began bringing 600 cubic metres of oil per day to Zama, in northwestern Alberta, in early 1985. From Zama, Norman Wells oil travels through other crude oil arteries to markets in Canada and the United States. Interprovincial Pipeline was the foundation from which the large Canadian corporation Enbridge grew.

=== Gas pipelines and politics ===
Through much of the 20th century, Canadians viewed natural gas as a patrimony, an essential resource to husband with great care for tomorrow. By contrast, they generally viewed oil as just another commodity. Only in special circumstances was there much public debate about crude oil exports.

Canadian attitudes about gas date back to the late 19th century, when Ontario stopped exports. The province began exporting natural gas in 1891 to Buffalo, N.Y. from the Bertie-Humberstone field near Welland, Ontario. Another pipeline under the Detroit River transported gas from the Essex field to Detroit. And by 1897, a pipeline to Toledo, Ohio began taxing the Essex gas field to its limits. As a result, the Ontario government revoked the pipeline licenses and passed a law prohibiting the export of both gas and electricity.

The reasons behind Canada's protectionist policies toward natural gas are complex, but closely tied to the value gas has for space heating in a cold climate. These issues were not finally resolved in favour of continentalism until the implementation of the North American Free Trade Agreement in the 1990s.

By the late 1940s, Alberta's Conservation Board had eliminated most of the wasteful production practices associated with the Turner Valley oil and gas field. As new natural gas discoveries greeted drillers in the Leduc-fueled search for oil, the industry agitated for licenses to export natural gas. That was when they discovered that getting permits to export Alberta natural gas was politically more complex than getting permits to export oil. Before giving approval, the provincial government appointed the Dinning Natural Gas Commission to inquire into Alberta's likely reserves and future demand.

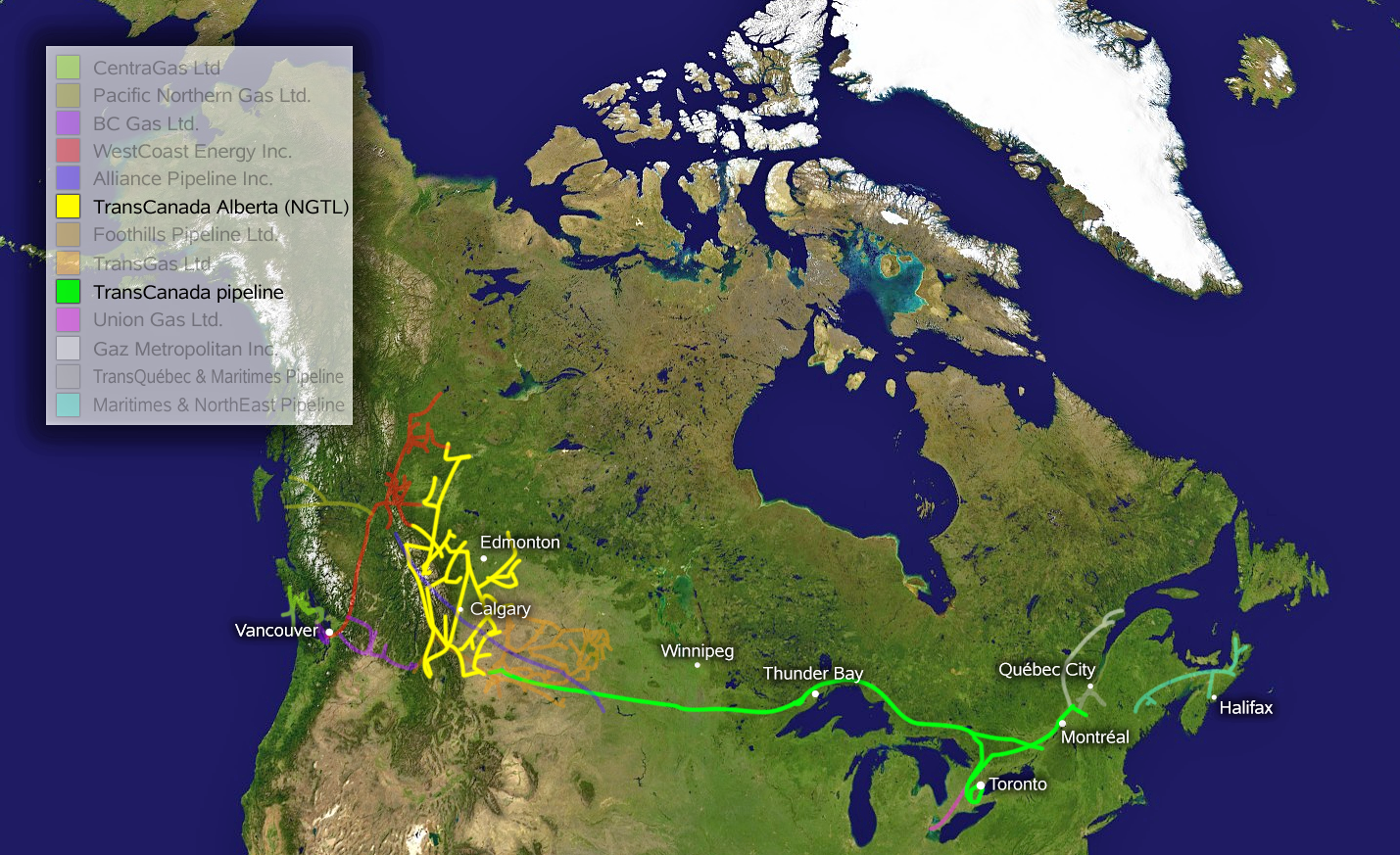
The route of the TransCanada Pipeline. The yellow lines in Western Canada reflect an acquisition by TransCanada of the gathering system developed by AGTL (later known as Nova Corporation). The red represents Westcoast Transmission's pipelines. Export pipelines stop at the US border, where they connect to US carriers.

In its March 1949 report, the Dinning Commission supported the principle that Albertans should have first call on provincial natural gas supplies, and that Canadians should have priority over foreign users if an exportable surplus developed. Alberta accepted the recommendations of the Dinning Commission, and later declared it would only authorize exports of gas in excess of a 30-year supply.

Shortly thereafter, Alberta's Legislature passed the Gas Resources Conservation Act, which gave Alberta greater control over natural gas at the wellhead, and empowered the Conservation Board to issue export permits. This led to the creation of the Alberta Gas Trunk Line, which gathered gas from wells in the province and to delivered it to exit points.

There were many reasons for the creation of AGTL. One was that the provincial government considered it sensible to have a single gathering system in Alberta to feed export pipelines, rather than a number of separate networks. Another was that pipelines crossing provincial boundaries and those leaving the country fall under federal jurisdiction. By creating a separate entity to carry gas within Alberta, the provincial government stopped Ottawa's authority at the border. Incorporated in 1954, AGTL issued public shares in 1957. The company later restructured as NOVA Corporation, sold its pipeline assets (now primarily operated by TransCanada Corporation), and transformed itself into NOVA Chemicals.

The federal government's policy objectives at the time reflected concern for national integration and equity among Canadians. In 1949, Ottawa created a framework for regulating interprovincial and international pipelines with its Pipe Lines Act. The federal government, like Alberta, treated natural gas as a resource that was so important for national security that domestic supply needed to be guaranteed into the foreseeable future before exports would be allowed.

Although Americans were interested in Canadian exports, they understandably wanted cheap gas. After all, their natural gas industry was a major player in the American economy, and American policy-makers were not eager to allow foreign competition unless there was clear economic benefit. Consequently, major gas transportation projects were politically and economically uncertain.

=== Construction ===
Among the first group of applicants hoping to remove natural gas from Alberta was Westcoast Transmission Co. Ltd., backed by British Columbia-born entrepreneur Frank McMahon. The Westcoast plan, eventually achieved in a slightly modified form, took gas from northwestern Alberta and northeastern B.C. and piped it to Vancouver and to the American Pacific Northwest, supplying B.C.'s interior along the way. Except for a small export of gas to Montana which began in 1951, Westcoast was the first applicant to receive permission to remove gas from Alberta.

Although turned down in 1951, Westcoast received permission in 1952 to take 50 billion cubic feet (1.4×10^{9} m^{3}) of gas out of the Peace River area of Alberta annually for five years. The company subsequently made gas discoveries across the border in B.C. which further supported the scheme. However, the United States Federal Power Commission (later the Federal Energy Regulatory Commission) rejected the Westcoast proposal in 1954 after three years of hearings and 28,000 pages of testimony.

Within eighteen months, however, Westcoast returned with a revised proposal, found a new participant in the venture, and received FPC approval. Construction began on Canada's first major gas export pipeline.

The Canadian section of the line cost $198 million to build and at the time was the largest private financial undertaking in the country's history. Built in the summer seasons of 1956 and 1957, the line moved gas from the Fort St. John and Peace River areas 1,250 kilometres to Vancouver and the American border.

TransCanada PipeLines Limited also applied early for permission to remove natural gas from Alberta. Two applicants originally expressed interest in moving gas east: Canadian Delhi Oil Company (now called TCPL) proposed moving gas to the major cities of eastern Canada by an all-Canadian route, while Western Pipelines wanted to stop at Winnipeg with a branch line south to sell into the midwestern United States. In 1954 C.D. Howe forced the two companies into a shotgun marriage, with the all-Canadian route preferred over its more economical but American-routed competitor.

This imposed solution reflected problems encountered with the construction of the Interprovincial oil pipeline. Despite the speed of its construction, the earlier line caused angry debate in Parliament, with the Opposition arguing that Canadian centres deserved consideration before American customers and that "the main pipeline carrying Canadian oil should be laid in Canadian soil". By constructing its natural gas mainline along an entirely Canadian route, TCPL accommodated nationalist sentiments, solving a political problem for the federal government.

The regulatory process for TCPL proved long and arduous. After rejecting proposals twice, Alberta finally granted its permission to export gas from the province in 1953. At first, the province waited for explorers to prove gas reserves sufficient for its thirty-year needs, intending to only allow exports in excess of those needs. After clearing this hurdle, the federal government virtually compelled TCPL into a merger with Western pipelines. When this reorganized TCPL went before the Federal Power Commission for permission to sell gas into the United States, the Americans greeted it coolly. The FPC proved sceptical of the project's financing and unimpressed with Alberta's reserves.

Engineering problems made the 1,090-kilometre section crossing the Canadian Shield the most difficult leg of the TransCanada pipeline. Believing construction costs could make the line uneconomic, private sector sponsors refused to finance this portion of the line. Since the federal government wanted the line laid for nationalistic reasons, the reigning Liberals put a bill before Parliament to create a crown corporation to build and own the Canadian Shield portion of the line, leasing it back to TCPL. The government restricted debate on the bill in order to get construction underway by June, knowing that delays beyond that month would postpone the entire project a year. The use of closure created a furore which spilled out of Parliament and into the press. Known as the Great Pipeline Debate, this parliamentary episode contributed to the Louis St. Laurent government's defeat at the polls in 1957. But the bill passed and construction of the TransCanada pipeline began.

A stock trading scandal surrounding Northern Ontario Natural Gas, the contractor for the Northern Ontario leg of the pipeline, also implicated Sudbury mayor Leo Landreville and Ontario provincial cabinet ministers Philip Kelly, William Griesinger and Clare Mapledoram between 1955 and 1958.

The completion of this project was a spectacular technological achievement. In the first three years of construction (1956–58), workers installed 3,500 kilometres of pipe, stretching from the Alberta-Saskatchewan border to Toronto and Montreal. Gas service to Regina and Winnipeg commenced in 1957 and the line reached the Lakehead before the end of that year. In late 1957, during a high-pressure line test on the section of the line from Winnipeg to Port Arthur (today called Thunder Bay), about five and a half kilometres of pipeline blew up near Dryden. After quick repairs, the line delivered Alberta gas to Port Arthur before the end of the year, making the entire trip on its own wellhead pressure.

Building the Canadian Shield leg required continual blasting. For one 320-metre (1,050 ft) stretch, the construction crew drilled 2.4-metre (8 ft) holes into the rock, three abreast, at 56-centimetre (22 in) intervals. Dynamite broke up other stretches, 300 metres (1,000 ft) at a time.

On October 10, 1958, a final weld completed the line and on October 27, the first Alberta gas entered Toronto. For more than two decades, the Trans-Canada pipeline was the longest in the world. Only in the early 1980s was its length finally exceeded by a Soviet pipeline from Siberia to Western Europe.

With these events - the discovery and development of oil and gas reservoirs and of processing and transportation infrastructure - Canada's petroleum industry established its foundations. However, over the decades that followed the industry began to develop other domestic petroleum resources. These included oil sands and heavy oil deposits, and the northern and offshore frontiers. Also, the natural gas sector constructed extensive natural gas liquids extraction facilities. Taken together, these developments helped Canada create one of the world's largest and most complex petroleum industries.

== See also ==
- Technological and industrial history of Canada
- History of Canada
- Energy policy of Canada
- Natural gas processing
- Science and technology in Canada
- History of petroleum

== Metric conversion ==
- Canada's oil measure, the cubic metre, is unique in the world. It is metric in the sense that it uses metres, but it is based on volume so that Canadian units can be easily converted into barrels. In the rest of the metric world, the standard for measuring oil is the tonne. The advantage of the latter measure is that it reflects oil quality. In general, lower grade oils are heavier.
- One cubic metre of oil = 6.29 barrels. One cubic metre of natural gas = 35.49 cubic feet (1.005 m^{3}). One kilopascal = 1% of atmospheric pressure (near sea level).
