= Eugene Coste =

Canadian mining engineer (1859–1940)

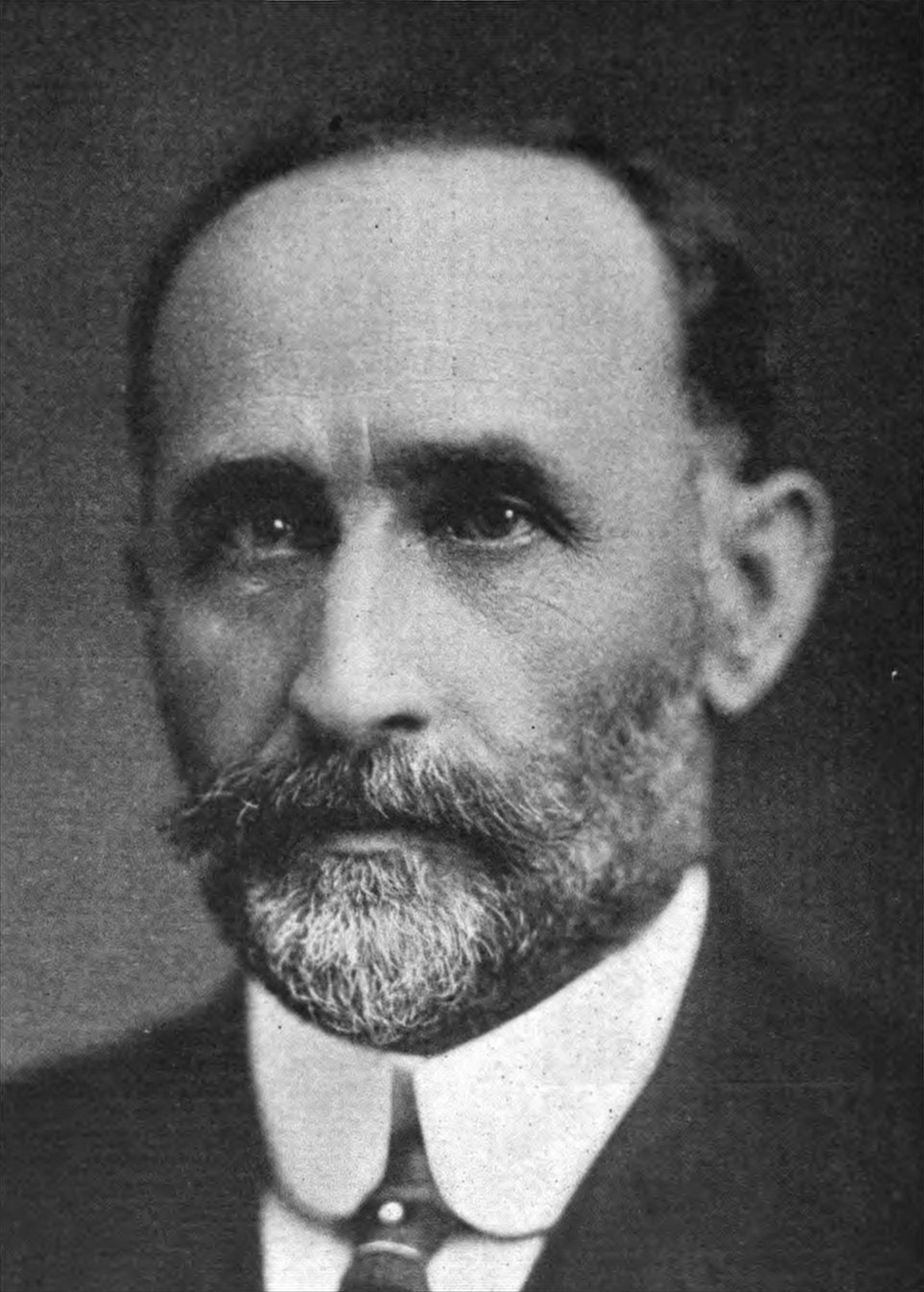
- Born: Eugene Marius Coste; July 8, 1859; Amherstburg, Canada West
- Died: January 23, 1940 (aged 80); Toronto, Ontario
- Education: École Nationale Supérieure des Mines
- Occupation: Mining engineer

Eugene Marius Coste (July 8, 1859 – January 23, 1940) was a Canadian mining engineer, known as the "Father of Natural Gas in Canada". He found and exploited extensive gas and oil fields in Ontario, and became the first to produce and deliver natural gas in commercial quantities in Alberta.

== Life ==
Born on July 8, 1859, in Amherstburg, Ontario, Eugene was the middle son of Napoleon Alexandre Coste and Mathilde Robidoux. His father was a native of Marseille, who had gone to sea and then jumped ship at Amherstburg.

Coste took a mining engineering degree from the École Nationale Supérieure des Mines in Paris. He worked with the Geological Survey of Canada for six years before embarking upon a career as an independent mining engineer.

In the nineteenth century, the inorganic school of thought argued that unknown processes operating at great depth in the earth produced petroleum, and that its occurrence was associated with volcanic activity. Eugene Coste stoutly held this view.

=== Discoveries in Ontario ===
After reading a geology report that associated petroleum deposits with an anticline structure in Ohio, in 1889 Coste selected a site for his first drilling attempt in Essex County, Ontario. In 1889 he brought in the first producing gas well in Essex County. His work in that area eventually led to the formation of the Ontario utility, Union Gas. The reservoir he discovered became known as the Essex gas field and by 1894 included approximately thirty wells. In 1890 he began to export natural gas to Buffalo, New York, from a well near Niagara Falls, Ontario. By 1895, his United Gas and Oil Company was delivering hydrocarbons to Ontario communities, and also to American consumers on the Detroit side of the river.

Coste was president of the Canadian Mining Institute from 1903 to 1905.

=== Discoveries in Alberta ===
Later in his life, Coste moved west and drilled the locally famous "Old Glory" gas well near Bow Island, Alberta, in 1909. In 1912, his Canadian Western natural Gas Company built a 280-kilometre pipeline connecting his Bow Island gas field to Lethbridge and Calgary. It augmented the Dingman enterprise in Calgary, which was unable to supply the growing demands of the city. By 1913, several other towns in southern Alberta also boasted natural gas service from the Canadian Western system and Coste's pioneering enterprise provided fuel to nearly 7,000 customers.

=== Death ===
Coste died in Toronto on January 23, 1940.

== Sources ==
- Peter McKenzie-Brown; Gordon Jaremko; David Finch (15 November 1993). The great oil age: the petroleum industry in Canada. Detselig Enterprises. ISBN 978-1-55059-072-2.
