= History of the petroleum industry in Canada (natural gas liquids) =

Canada's natural gas liquids industry dates back to the discovery of wet natural gas at Turner Valley, Alberta in 1914. The gas was less important than the natural gasoline - "skunk gas" it was called, because of its distinctive odour - that early producers extracted from it. That natural gas liquid (NGL) could be poured directly into an automobile's fuel tank.

As the natural gas industry grew with pipeline construction in the 1950s, many companies - Imperial, British American (B/A; later Gulf Canada) and Shell, for example - constructed plants in Alberta to process newly discovered natural gas so it could be made pipeline-ready. Many of these plants extracted NGLs from natural gas as part of natural gas processing.

For NGLs to become a major business, however, took the efforts of large and imaginative players, plus the development of a much larger gas supply from which to extract these light hydrocarbons. Conditions were right in the 1960s, and the two companies that took advantage of the opportunity were Amoco Corporation and Dome Petroleum, neither of which is any longer in existence. Amoco took over Dome after the company essentially went bankrupt in 1988, and BP took over Amoco in a friendly merger ten years later. Here is the story of how those two companies developed key components of the infrastructure for this vital niche industry.

Headquarters for Amoco Corporation were in Chicago, because that city is close to Whiting, Indiana. Whiting was home of Amoco’s largest oil refinery (and one of the largest in the world). In operation since 1890, Whiting originally refined sour crude oil from the neighbouring state of Ohio. And it was Standard of Indiana's (Amoco's) most important single asset after the US Supreme Court ordered the Standard Oil Trust broken up. In its early years, Amoco was primarily a refiner and a marketer of refined products to expanding Midwestern markets. Whiting provided products that could be marketed from Chicago — a city that was itself a large market for petroleum products.

By 1970, Amoco had become one of the largest integrated oil corporations in the world through both acquisitions and internal growth. Besides being a large-scale refiner and distributor of refined products, it was a powerful force in petrochemicals, oil and gas exploration and production, pipelines, and in the marketing of crude oil, natural gas and natural gas liquids (NGLs).

The corporation was growing globally, but it was heavily focused in North America. And though its oil and gas activity was concentrated in the US southwest and in western Canada, its marketing presence was strongest in middle America. From its Chicago base, the corporation had unrivalled intelligence about hydrocarbon demand in the US Midwest.

== Liquids extraction in Turner Valley ==
Between 1924 and 1927, Royalite operated two gas processing facilities side-by-side in Turner Valley: the sweetening plant and the liquids plant.

The liquids extraction plant closed in 1927 and reopened in 1933 after the company revamped the facility. The new plant used "lean oil" absorption, a process that forced raw gas into contact with lean oil in chains of steel bubble caps. Improvement of the absorption medium and contact between the gas and the oil made for substantially higher rates of liquids recovery. The new plant was so successful that other companies built two similar plants in Turner Valley, and Royalite built a second plant to handle its production from the south end of the field. Gas and Oil Products Ltd. built a similar plant at Hartell in 1934 and British American (BA) opened one at Longview in 1936.

Once Alberta's Petroleum and Natural Gas Conservation Board began operating in 1938, the BA and Gas and Oil Products Limited plants had to change their operations significantly. Only Royalite had a market for its residue of gas stripped of liquids in the Canadian Western Natural Gas distribution system. The other two plants flared or burned off most of their residue gas until the board ruled that only wells connected to a market could be produced, stopping the practice. Since the rule applied only to wells that tapped the oil reservoir's overlying gas cap, the Hartell and Longview plants stayed in operation by processing solution gas, or gas dissolved in oil from the Valley's wells.

== Amoco/Dome Synergies ==
As the Turner Valley story illustrates, the extraction of natural gas liquids goes back to the industry's early years. However, the development of partnerships between the large American oil company Amoco and the young, dynamic Dome Petroleum to create sophisticated liquids infrastructure in Western Canada.

Headquartered in Calgary, Amoco Canada’s liquids marketing group had a great deal of independence in the early years. However, many synergies were possible through cooperation between Chicago and Calgary. As importantly, Amoco and Dome Petroleum formed a number of strategic partnerships in the liquids business during the 1960s. So extensive were those partnerships that, when Dome went on the block in 1986, it was inevitable that Amoco would be an aggressive suitor.

Alberta’s liquids business dates to the development of the Pembina field, when Dallas-based Goliad Oil and Gas received rights to recover solution gas from the field. Also known as "casing head gas" or "associated gas," solution gas is dissolved in reservoir oil at underground pressures. Released under the relatively low pressures at Earth’s surface, it usually includes natural gas liquids. Often, as at Pembina, these can be profitably extracted. While Goliad received the gas from Pembina, the separated liquids were returned to the producers.

At about the same time, Dome developed a solution gas gathering business based on oilfields around Steelman, Saskatchewan. And in Alberta, plants like the one at Whitecourt began processing liquids-rich gas in 1961. Amoco began planning this gas plant in 1957, as local gas discoveries made it clear a major new plant was necessary. When it went into production, West Whitecourt quickly began to boast the biggest volumes of condensate production in Canada: 13,000 barrels per day (2,100 m^{3}/d). And from there, volumes went up. Since that time, bigger plants have made the records of 1962 seem small. However, this plant was nonetheless an industry pioneer.

=== Extracting NGLs ===
Separated from a gas stream, NGLs are an undifferentiated batch of light hydrocarbons — ethane, propane, butane and condensate. To separate them into more valuable individual products requires fractionation facilities. Fractionation towers separate a stream of mixed NGL feedstock into specification-grade ethane, propane, butane and condensate products.

Distillation is the process used to fractionate NGLs. The different components in a liquids mix evaporate at different temperatures. Thus, when heat is applied to a stream of product entering a fractionation tower, lighter components vapourize and move to the top of the tower; heavier components drop to the bottom. The amount of heat applied to the brew depends on which component is being separated out for sale to the customer.

The lighter product coming off the top of the tower as a vapour — called the overhead product — is then cooled so it will condense back into a liquid. To achieve full separation, a stream of product is processed through a series of towers. "Spec" or high-grade product is taken off the top of a tower, and the bottom product becomes the feedstock for the next tower.

In the mid-1960s, there were only two fractionation facilities in Alberta. One was a plant at Devon, Alberta, and owned by Imperial Oil. That plant processed liquids from Leduc, Redwater and other Imperial-operated fields. Later, it also processed liquids from Swan Hills, a wet gas field which was operated by other companies. Also, in 1964 Imperial constructed another plant for solution gas/liquids extraction to service Judy Creek, Swan Hills, and other fields.

Originally, Hudson’s Bay Oil and Gas Company had applied to construct, operate and own that plant. Imperial then made a proposal of its own. Amoco and British American intervened at an Oil and Gas Conservation Board hearing with a proposal that would give all operators a share of the plant. Under pressure from the Amoco/BA plan, Imperial modified its proposal and was awarded the project. As a result of the Amoco/BA intervention, Imperial became operator, but Amoco and the other producers were partners.

Because Amoco would soon begin to receive its considerable liquids from Swan Hills in kind, the need to find ways to get optimum value from these liquids was clear. Markets in western Canada could not absorb the large and growing liquids volumes that Alberta was producing. However, markets in central Canada and the US Midwest could. Working with Chicago, Amoco Canada began developing a marketing strategy, a critical part of which would be the delivery system.

=== Recycling plants ===
Recycling plants such as those at Kaybob, West Whitecourt and Crossfield produced liquids-rich gas from "retrograde condensation" reservoirs. They stripped condensate and natural gas liquids and sulfur (which they alternately stored in blocks or sold, depending on demand and price), then re-injected the dry gas to cycle the reservoir to capture more liquids. Usually these plants needed make-up gas to replace the volume of the liquids stripped which came from other reservoirs. In the case of West Whitecourt, they also processed dry but sour gas from the Pine Creek field (near Edson) as a source of make-up gas. In the case of Crossfield, the liquids-rich gas came from the Wabamun D-1 zone and the make-up gas from the uphole Elkton zone. Most of these plants were built in the days of 16 cent (per 1000 cubic feet) long-term contracts from TransCanada PipeLine when the National Energy Board required 25 years of reserves in the ground to gain an export permit (from Canada). What drove the economics of this procedure was not gas production, but the liquids that could be recovered and sold as part of the crude mix.

== Dome-Amoco partnership ==
Dome had built the other fractionation plant, known as the Edmonton Liquid Gas Plant, in 1962. As Amoco made plans to build liquids as a business, in 1967 the company bought a half interest in this facility. This arrangement was the beginning of a series of liquids-related deals that would soon see Amoco and Dome partnering to become the largest players in Canada’s NGL business.

Another Amoco/Dome joint venture soon followed. At the end of the ‘60s, Alberta and Southern Gas Company began building a larger plant at Cochrane, a small town just west of Calgary. In industry parlance, this was a straddle plant. Another step in the development of the Amoco/Dome liquids system was Dome’s construction — in 1976 — of the Edmonton Ethane Extraction Plant. This straddle plant replaced an earlier facility.

Straddle plants extract ethane and heavier liquids from the gas stream, returning drier gas (by now almost entirely methane) to the pipeline. Liquids fetch a higher price (relative to their energy or BTU content) because they have uses other than firing furnaces — as gasoline additives and petrochemical feedstocks, for example.

While plant construction was underway, Dome and Amoco built a 320-kilometre pipeline from Cochrane to Edmonton (the Co-Ed line), with Dome as operator. This line fed liquids to Dome/Amoco’s new Fort Saskatchewan liquids terminal, and helped the company develop expertise in pipeline operations. Other Dome- and Amoco-operated lines were soon delivering NGLs to the Fort Saskatchewan plant.

Built in the early 1970s, Fort Saskatchewan supplemented the Edmonton Liquid Gas Plant. Key to the plant’s success was the existence underground of large salt formations. The operator was able to dissolve ("wash") huge storage caverns in these formations. Those caverns provided large volumes of inexpensive, safe inventory capacity for the plant. Having storage capacity for NGLs enabled the company to buy and store surplus NGLs year round, including times when markets were soft and prices dropped to seasonal lows.

The Dome-operated plant quickly became a hub of western Canada’s liquids business. The reason is that Amoco and Dome created a partnership to do something that had never been tried before, anywhere. Using Fort Saskatchewan as a staging point, they batched natural gas liquids through Interprovincial’s oil pipeline to Sarnia. In 1980, the partnership added fractionation facilities at Fort Saskatchewan.

The impact of this arrangement on the economics of transporting large volumes of NGL was considerable. To send propane that distance by rail at the time cost $3.50-$4.20 per barrel. Batching the stuff through Amoco/Dome facilities and IPL brought transportation costs down to approximately $1 per barrel.

=== Sarnia ===
Liquefied petroleum gases (or LPGs, another name for propane and butane) have to be contained well above atmospheric pressure to remain in liquid form. The partners therefore had to build special "breakout" facilities in Superior, Wisconsin, to enable this operation to work. They also had to construct batch receipt facilities, storage, and a fractionation plant at Sarnia. That plant went on stream in 1970.

Sarnia was chosen for several reasons. Most importantly, of course, it is the terminus of Interprovincial Pipelines’ main lines. The city itself is a big part of central Canada’s petroleum market. Near the 1857 Oil Springs discovery, Sarnia became a refining centre during Ontario’s 19th-century oil boom and a petrochemical centre during World War II. Sarnia has underground salt formations like those at Fort Saskatchewan. Caverns washed into those formations were used to receive NGL from IPL, and to store specification grade products to meet seasonal demand.

From the Sarnia plant, Amoco and Dome could meet regional requirements for liquids by rail, water and road links to central Canada and the US Midwest. Also, of course, pipelines were constructed to local petrochemical plants. Thus, Sarnia had the essential infrastructure for a successful marketing operation.

Initially, the plant was small. Daily capacity was 17,500 barrels (2,780 m^{3}) of liquefied petroleum gases (propane and butane), and 12,500 barrels (1,990 m^{3}) of condensate and crude oil. It grew quickly, however: salt storage caverns were soon added, and a 1974 expansion of the fractionation plant increased NGL processing capacity to nearly 50,000 barrels per day (7,900 m^{3}/d).

The early growth of Amoco’s liquids business was astonishing. By 1970 Amoco Canada’s NGL production had reached 25,000 barrels per day (4,000 m^{3}/d). Amoco Corporation’s North American liquids operations processed 2.9 billion cubic feet (82,000,000 m^{3}) of gas per day to produce 105,000 barrels (16,700 m^{3}) of liquids. Those volumes represented about 4 per cent of North America’s gas processing capacity, 5 per cent of the continent’s liquids capacity.

As Amoco prepared to increase market share for liquids in the Midwest, its US liquids subsidiary — Tuloma Gas Products by name — moved headquarters from Tulsa to Chicago. Clearly, the business would grow through partnership between Calgary and Chicago.

== Empress ==
During this early period of growth, Dome proposed to build a liquids recovery plant — in effect, a very large straddle plant — at the Empress, Alberta, delivery point to the TransCanada transmission line. The Empress plant sits just inside the Alberta/Saskatchewan border. This is for reasons related to both politics and infrastructure. Politically, Alberta wanted value to be added inside provincial borders. As importantly, it made sense to extract liquids before sending the dry gas that remained - unadulterated methane - into the export market.

During inquiries into natural gas exports in the 1950s, the ERCB recommended the creation of a province-wide natural gas gathering system. The thinking behind this idea was twofold: first, it would be more efficient to develop a single gathering system than to let gathering systems evolve piecemeal. Second, such a system would eliminate the possibility of federal regulation of gas within the province. Alberta was jealous of its hard-won control over natural resources and saw gas transportation within the province as an aspect of resource management. The province was also very conscious of the potential of natural gas and its products for provincial industrial development.

Accordingly, Alberta passed the Alberta Gas Trunk Line Act. Alberta Gas Trunk Line (later known as NOVA Corporation’s Gas Transmission Division) would gather gas within the province, delivering the commodity to federally regulated TransCanada PipeLines and other export pipelines just inside the Alberta border. Empress was the site at which TransCanada PipeLines would receive gas for delivery to eastern markets.

Pacific Petroleums (acquired by Petro-Canada) had already built a straddle plant at Empress to extract liquids, so Dome’s idea was not new. However, Dome built a much larger facility there. The facility was constructed on a patch of bald prairie in the early 1970s. The owners were Dome and a TransCanada subsidiary, which later sold its interest to PanCanadian Petroleums.

The NGLs recovered at the new Empress plant needed to be transported to market, and the largest markets continued to be in the US Midwest. So Dome built injection facilities at nearby Kerrobert, Saskatchewan. Those facilities enabled Dome to inject additional liquids into the batches that were flowing from Fort Saskatchewan through Interprovincial Pipeline.

At the same time the team of Dow Chemicals, Nova and Dome put together the Alberta Ethane Project. This plan was essentially a $1.5 billion blueprint for the creation of a petrochemicals business in Alberta based on natural gas liquids, especially ethane. And the plan took on a political life of its own, since it offered the opportunity for value-added products to be manufactured in Alberta for export. The provincial government stood four-square behind it.

=== Other components ===
The plan consisted of four components. The straddle plants at Empress were the first. The second was a petrochemical complex at Joffre — then a village near the city of Red Deer — to convert ethane to the petrochemical feedstock ethylene. This would form the basis for a petrochemical manufacturing centre. That centre grew dramatically during the decades that followed. By the late 1990s, ten large-scale petrochemical plants were operating there.

A third component was the Alberta Ethane Gathering System (AEGS,) which would deliver ethane from Alberta straddle plants to storage caverns at Fort Saskatchewan. This system would include a reversible connection to the Joffre petrochemical complex. In addition, one leg of the AEGS pipeline would connect Empress, which would soon become the largest gas processing centre in the world.

The fourth component was the Cochin Pipeline, which would ship ethylene from Alberta to Sarnia, and would also export ethane and propane to the US. The world’s longest NGL pipeline went on stream in 1978. Amoco had the opportunity to participate in this venture, but chose not to do so. (There is irony in this, since Amoco became operator of both the Cochin pipeline and Empress after the acquisition of Dome.)

To complete the picture of the Canadian liquids business, it is worth noting that in 1977 Amoco and Dome bought the Canadian assets of Goliad Oil and Gas Company. This increased the supply of liquids available to Amoco by about 1,800 barrels per day (290 m^{3}/d). But this acquisition also had symbolic importance, since Goliad had such a key role in the early liquids business.

Although not primarily related to the liquids business, the merger with Dome brought Amoco another large transportation system. The Rangeland Pipeline, which was originally developed by Hudson’s Bay Oil and Gas, by 1998 moved about 130,000 barrels (21,000 m^{3}) of oil per day. Because the company had developed pipeline expertise primarily through the liquids business, Amoco’s liquids organization operated the line.

While Amoco and Dome were the lead players in developing Canada’s liquids industry, neither company neglected exploration, development and production operations. Both companies helped pioneer conventional exploration and production in western Canada during the 1950s and '60s. And beginning in the 1960s, they were also pioneers in Canada’s geographic frontiers and in oil sands and heavy oil development.

== Metric conversions ==
- One cubic metre of oil = 6.29 barrels.
- One cubic metre of natural gas = 35.49 cubic feet.
- One kilopascal = 1% of atmospheric pressure (near sea level).

Canada's oil measure, the cubic metre, is unique in the world. It is metric in the sense that it uses metres, but it is based on volume so that Canadian units can be easily converted into barrels. In the rest of the metric world, the standard for measuring oil is the tonne. The advantage of the latter measure is that it reflects oil quality. In general, lower grade oils are heavier.

== See also ==
- Energy policy of Canada
