= 2018 in paleontology =

Paleontology or palaeontology is the study of prehistoric life forms on Earth through the examination of plant and animal fossils. This includes the study of body fossils, tracks (ichnites), burrows, cast-off parts, fossilised feces (coprolites), palynomorphs and chemical residues. Because humans have encountered fossils for millennia, paleontology has a long history both before and after becoming formalized as a science. This article records significant discoveries and events related to paleontology that occurred or were published in the year 2018.

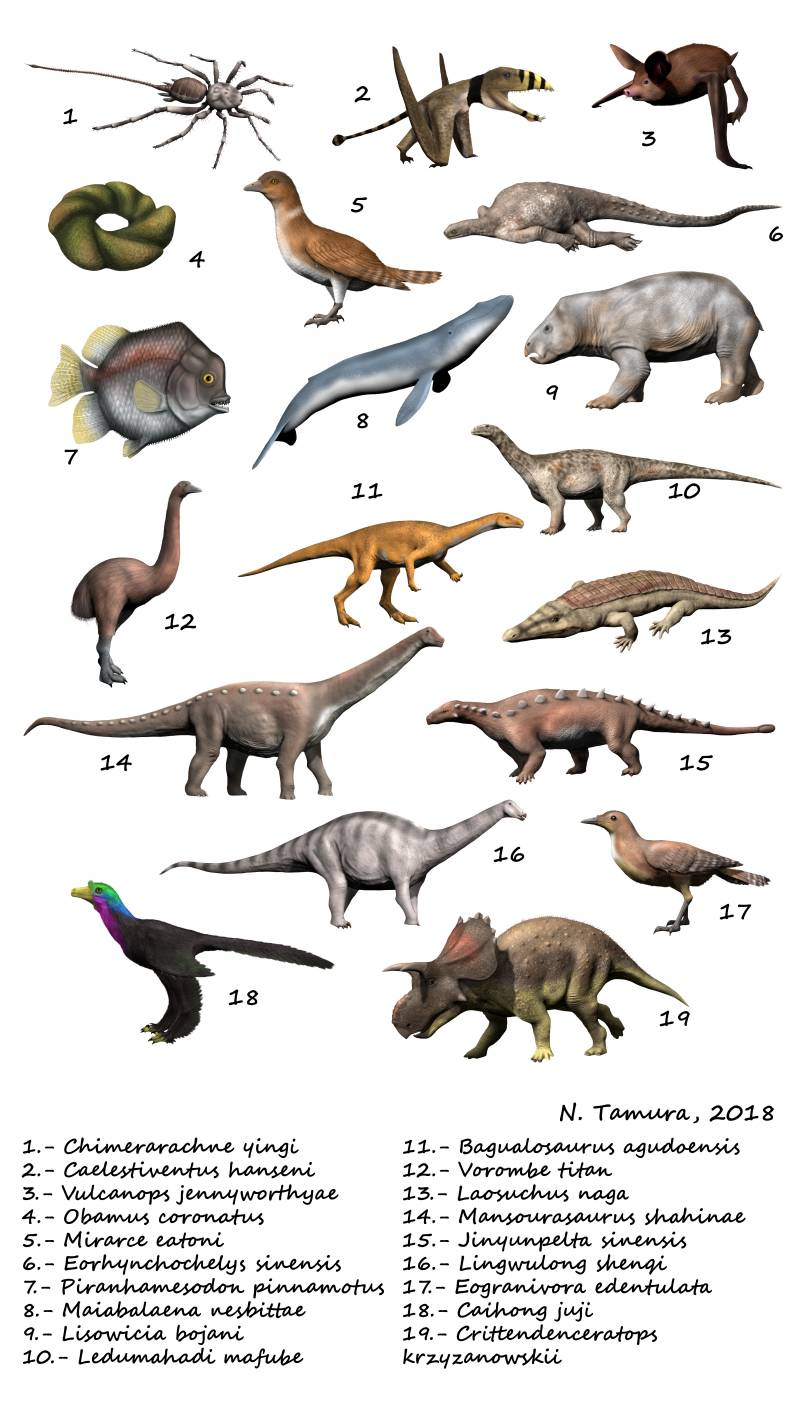
Extinct animals named in 2018

== Flora ==
=== Fungi ===
Name	Novelty	Status	Authors	Age	Type locality	Country	Notes	Images
Chaenotheca succina	Sp. nov	Valid	Rikkinen & Schmidt in Rikkinen et al.	Eocene (Priabonian)	Baltic amber	Russia (Kaliningrad Oblast)	A fungus, a species of Chaenotheca.	
Notothyrites (?) leptostrobi	Sp. nov	Valid	Frolov in Frolov & Mashchuk	Early and Middle Jurassic	Prisayanskaya Formation	Russia	A member of the family Microthyriaceae.	
Palaeomycus	Gen. et sp. nov	Valid	Poinar	Late Cretaceous (Cenomanian)	Burmese amber	Myanmar	A fungus described on the basis of pycnidia. Genus includes new species P. epallelus. Announced in 2018; the final version of the article naming it was published in 2020.	
Paleoambrosia	Gen. et sp. nov	Valid	Poinar & Vega	Late Cretaceous (Cenomanian)	Burmese amber	Myanmar	An ambrosia fungus associated with the beetle Palaeotylus femoralis. Genus includes new species P. entomophila.	
Perexiflasca	Gen. et sp. nov	Valid	Krings, Harper & Taylor	Devonian (Pragian)	Rhynie chert	United Kingdom	A small, chytrid-like organism. Genus includes new species P. tayloriana.	
Phyllopsora magna	Sp. nov	Valid	Kaasalainen, Rikkinen & Schmidt in Kaasalainen et al.	Miocene	Dominican amber	Dominican Republic	A lichenized fungus, a species of Phyllopsora.	
Retesporangicus	Gen. et sp. nov	Valid	Strullu-Derrien in Strullu-Derrien et al.	Early Devonian	Rhynie chert	United Kingdom	A fungus belonging to the group Blastocladiomycota, of uncertain phylogenetic placement within the latter group. Genus includes new species R. lyonii.	
Vizellopsidites	Gen. et sp. nov	Valid	Khan, Bera & Bera	Late Pliocene to early Pleistocene	Kimin Formation	India	A fossil fungus found on the surface of fossilized leaf fragments. Genus includes new species V. siwalika.	
Windipila pumila	Sp. nov	Valid	Krings & Harper	Early Devonian	Rhynie chert	United Kingdom	A fungal reproductive unit.	

== Cnidarians ==
=== Research ===
- New three dimensionally phosphatized microfossils of coronate scyphozoan Qinscyphus necopinus, including a new type of fossil embryo, are described from the Cambrian (Fortunian) Kuanchuanpu Formation (China) by Shao et al. (2018), who interpret their findings as indicating that Qinscyphus underwent direct development.
- A study on the morphology of the conulariid species Carinachites spinatus based on a new specimen collected from the lower Cambrian Kuanchuanpu Formation (China) is published by Han et al. (2018).
- Revision of stony corals from the Lower Cretaceous (Berriasian) Oehrli Formation (Austria and Switzerland) is published by Baron-Szabo (2018), who compares this fauna with five additional Berriasian coral faunas.

=== New taxa ===
Name	Novelty	Status	Authors	Age	Type locality	Country	Notes
Acropora incogtita	Sp. nov	Valid	Berezovsky & Satanovska	Eocene		Ukraine	A stony coral, a species of Acropora.
Actinoseris riyadhensis	Sp. nov	Valid	Gameil, El-Sorogy & Al-Kahtany	Late Cretaceous (Campanian)	Aruma Formation	Saudi Arabia	A solitary coral. Announced in 2018; the final version of the article naming it was published in 2020.
Antheria fedorowskii	Sp. nov	Valid	Wang, Gorgij & Yao	Late Carboniferous		Iran	A rugose coral.
Antheria robusta	Sp. nov	Valid	Wang, Gorgij & Yao	Late Carboniferous		Iran	A rugose coral.
Asteroseris arabica	Sp. nov	Valid	Gameil, El-Sorogy & Al-Kahtany	Late Cretaceous (Campanian)	Aruma Formation	Saudi Arabia	A solitary coral. Announced in 2018; the final version of the article naming it was published in 2020.
Astraraeatrochus	Gen. et sp. nov	Valid	Löser & Heinrich	Late Cretaceous		Austria	A stony coral belonging to the superfamily Haplaraeoidea and the family Astraraeidae. The type species is A. bachi.
Astreoidogyra	Gen. et sp. nov	Valid	Ricci, Lathuilière & Rusciadelli	Late Jurassic		Italy	A member of the family Rhipidogyridae. The type species is A. giadae.
Aulocystis wendti	Sp. nov	Valid	Król, Zapalski & Berkowski	Devonian (Emsian)	Amerboh Group	Morocco	A tabulate coral belonging to the family Aulocystidae.
Bainbridgia bipartita	Sp. nov	Valid	Król, Zapalski & Berkowski	Devonian (Emsian)	Kess-Kess Formation	Morocco	A tabulate coral belonging to the family Pyrgiidae.
Battersbyia coactilis	Sp. nov	Valid	McLean	Devonian		Canada	A rugose coral.
Battersbyia sentosa	Sp. nov	Valid	McLean	Devonian		Canada	A rugose coral.
Cambrorhytium gracilis	Sp. nov	Valid	Chang et al.	Early Cambrian		China	
Caryophyllia (Caryophyllia) imamurai	Sp. nov	Valid	Niko	Miocene	Bihoku Group	Japan	A species of Caryophyllia.
Catenipora jingyangensis	Sp. nov	Valid	Liang, Elias & Lee	Ordovician (Katian)	Beiguoshan Formation	China	A tabulate coral.
Catenipora tiewadianensis	Sp. nov	Valid	Liang, Elias & Lee	Ordovician (Katian)	Beiguoshan Formation	China	A tabulate coral.
Catenipora tongchuanensis	Sp. nov	Valid	Liang, Elias & Lee	Ordovician (Sandbian)	Jinghe Formation	China	A tabulate coral.
Clausastrea eliasovae	Sp. nov	Valid	Ricci, Lathuilière & Rusciadelli	Late Jurassic		Italy	A member of the family Montlivaltiidae.
Crinopora ireneae	Sp. nov	Valid	Löser & Heinrich	Late Cretaceous		Austria	A stony coral belonging to the superfamily Heterocoenioidea and the family Carolastraeidae.
Crinopora thomasi	Sp. nov	Valid	Löser & Heinrich	Late Cretaceous		Austria	A stony coral belonging to the superfamily Heterocoenioidea and the family Carolastraeidae.
Cunnolites (Plesiocunnolites) riyadhensis	Sp. nov	Valid	Gameil, El-Sorogy & Al-Kahtany	Late Cretaceous (Campanian)	Aruma Formation	Saudi Arabia	A solitary coral. Announced in 2018; the final version of the article naming it was published in 2020.
Deltocyathoides bihokuensis	Sp. nov	Valid	Niko	Miocene	Bihoku Group	Japan	A stony coral.
Fuchungopora huilongensis	Sp. nov	Valid	Liang et al.	Devonian (Famennian)	Etoucun Formation	China	A syringoporoid tabulate coral.
Geroastrea	Gen. et sp. et comb. nov	Valid	Löser & Heinrich	Late Cretaceous		Austria; France; Iran	A stony coral belonging to the superfamily Cyclolitoidea and the family Synastraeidae. The type species is G. alexi; genus also includes G. audiensis (Reig Oriol, 1992), G. haueri (Reuss, 1854) and G. parvistella (Oppenheim, 1930).
Gosaviaraea aimeae	Sp. nov	Valid	Löser & Heinrich	Late Cretaceous		Austria	A stony coral.
Kozaniastrea	Gen. et sp. nov	Valid	Löser, Steuber & Löser	Late Cretaceous (Cenomanian)		Greece	A stony coral belonging to the superfamily Felixaraeoidea and the family Lamellofungiidae. The type species is K. pachysepta.
Lithophyllon comptus	Sp. nov	Valid	Berezovsky & Satanovska	Eocene		Ukraine	A stony coral, a species of Lithophyllon.
Lonsdaleia carnica	Sp. nov	Valid	Rodríguez, Schönlaub & Kabon	Carboniferous (Mississippian)	Kirchbach Formation	Austria	A rugose coral belonging to the family Axophyllidae.
Lyrielasma landryense	Sp. nov	Valid	McLean	Devonian		Canada	A rugose coral.
Nefocoenia seewaldi	Sp. nov	Valid	Löser & Heinrich	Late Cretaceous		Austria	A stony coral belonging to the superfamily Phyllosmilioidea and the family Phyllosmiliidae.
Nefocoenia werneri	Sp. nov	Valid	Löser & Heinrich	Late Cretaceous		Austria	A stony coral belonging to the superfamily Phyllosmilioidea and the family Phyllosmiliidae.
Neopilophyllia	Gen. et comb. nov	Valid	Wang in Wang et al.	Silurian (Telychian)	Ningqiang Formation	China	A rugose coral belonging to the new family Amplexoididae. The type species is "Ningqiangophyllum" crassothecatum Cao (1975); genus also includes "Ningqiangophyllum" tenuiseptatum irregulare Cao (1975) (raised to the rank of a separate species Neopilophyllia irregularis), "Ningqiangophyllum" ephippium Cao (1975) and "Pilophyllia" alternata Chen in Wang et al. (1986).
Oculina complanatis	Sp. nov	Valid	Berezovsky & Satanovska	Eocene		Ukraine	A stony coral, a species of Oculina.
Opolestraea	Gen. et comb. nov	Valid	Morycowa	Middle Triassic (Anisian)	Karchowice Beds	Poland	A stony coral belonging to the family Eckastraeidae. The type species is "Coelocoenia" exporrecta Weissermel (1925).
Pachyheterocoenia	Gen. et sp. et comb. nov	Valid	Löser & Heinrich	Late Cretaceous		Austria; Spain	A stony coral belonging to the superfamily Heterocoenioidea and the family Heterocoeniidae. The type species is P. leipnerae; genus also includes P. grandis (Reuss, 1854) and P. fuchsi (Felix, 1903).
Pachyphylliopsis	Gen. et sp. nov	Valid	Löser & Heinrich	Late Cretaceous		Austria; Iran; United Arab Emirates	A stony coral belonging to the superfamily Phyllosmilioidea and the family Phyllosmiliidae. The type species is P. magnum.
Paractinacis	Gen. et sp. nov	Valid	Löser & Heinrich	Late Cretaceous		Austria; Germany; Spain	A stony coral belonging to the superfamily Cyclolitoidea and the family Negoporitidae. The type species is P. uliae; genus might also include P. ? elegans (Reuss, 1854).
Plesiolites	Gen. et sp. nov	Valid	Löser, Steuber & Löser	Late Cretaceous (Cenomanian)		Greece	A stony coral belonging to the superfamily Misistelloidea. The type species is P. winnii.
Proplesiastraea rivkae	Sp. nov	Valid	Löser & Heinrich	Late Cretaceous		Austria	A stony coral belonging to the superfamily Cladocoroidea and the family Columastraeidae.
Psydracophyllum hinnuleum	Sp. nov	Valid	McLean	Devonian		Canada	A rugose coral.
Striatopora marsupia	Sp. nov	Valid	Król, Zapalski & Berkowski	Devonian (Emsian)	Amerboh Group	Morocco	A tabulate coral belonging to the family Pachyporidae.
Styloheterocoenia	Gen. et 2 sp. nov	Valid	Löser, Steuber & Löser	Late Cretaceous (Cenomanian)		Greece	A stony coral belonging to the superfamily Heterocoenioidea and the family Heterocoeniidae. The type species is S. hellenensis; genus also includes S. brunni.
Stylophora kibiensis	Sp. nov	Valid	Niko, Suzuki & Taguchi	Miocene	Katsuta Group	Japan	A species of Stylophora.
Sutherlandia jamalensis	Sp. nov	Valid	Niko et al.	Early Permian	Jamal Formation	Iran	A tabulate coral belonging to the order Favositida and the family Favositidae.
Synhydnophora	Gen. et sp. et comb. nov	Valid	Löser & Heinrich	Late Cretaceous		Austria	A stony coral belonging to the superfamily Cyclolitoidea and the family Synastraeidae. The type species is S. wagreichi; genus also includes and S. multilamellosa (Reuss, 1854).
Wendticyathus	Gen. et sp. nov	Valid	Berkowski	Devonian (Emsian)		Morocco	A rugose coral. Genus includes new species W. nudus.
Xystriphylloides distinctus	Sp. nov	Valid	Yu	Early Devonian		China	A rugose coral.
Xystriphyllum helenense	Sp. nov	Valid	McLean	Devonian		Canada	A rugose coral.

== Bryozoans ==
=== New taxa ===
Name	Novelty	Status	Authors	Age	Type locality	Country	Notes
Acanthodesia variegata	Sp. nov	Valid	Di Martino & Taylor	Holocene		Indonesia	A bryozoan belonging to the group Cheilostomata and the family Membraniporidae.
Calyptotheca sidneyi	Sp. nov	Valid	Di Martino & Taylor	Holocene		Indonesia	A bryozoan belonging to the group Cheilostomata and the family Bitectiporidae.
Characodoma wesselinghi	Sp. nov	Valid	Di Martino & Taylor	Holocene		Indonesia	A bryozoan belonging to the group Cheilostomata and the family Cleidochasmatidae.
Cystomeson	Gen. nov	Valid	Ernst, Krainer and Lucas	Mississippian	Lake Valley Formation	United States	A cystoporate bryozoan of the family Fistuliporidae.
Pleurocodonellina javanensis	Sp. nov	Valid	Di Martino & Taylor	Early Pleistocene	Pucangan Formation	Indonesia	A bryozoan belonging to the group Cheilostomata and the family Smittinidae.
Turbicellepora yasuharai	Sp. nov	Valid	Di Martino & Taylor	Holocene		Indonesia	A bryozoan belonging to the group Cheilostomata and the family Celleporidae.

== Brachiopods ==
=== Research ===
- Studies on the ontogenetic development of early acrotretoid brachiopods based on well preserved specimens of the earliest Cambrian species Eohadrotreta zhenbaensis and Eohadrotreta? zhujiahensis from the Shuijingtuo Formation (China) are published by Zhang et al. (2018).
- A study on the extinction and origination of members of the order Strophomenida during the Late Ordovician mass extinction is published by Sclafani et al. (2018).
- A study on the body size of several brachiopod assemblages recorded into the extinction interval prior to the Toarcian turnover, collected from representative localities around the Iberian Massif (Spain and Portugal), is published by García Joral, Baeza-Carratalá & Goy (2018).

=== New taxa ===
Name	Novelty	Status	Authors	Age	Type locality	Country	Notes
Acrotreta calabozoi	Sp. nov	Valid	Lavié	Ordovician (Sandbian)	Las Plantas Formation	Argentina	
Adygella socotrana	Sp. nov	Valid	Gaetani in Gaetani et al.	Middle Triassic		Yemen	A member of Terebratulida belonging to the family Dielasmatidae.
Ahtiella famatiniana	Sp. nov	Valid	Benedetto	Ordovician		Argentina	
Ahtiella tunaensis	Sp. nov	Valid	Benedetto	Ordovician		Argentina	
Ala alatiformis	Sp. nov	Valid	Waterhouse	Carboniferous	Jungle Creek Formation	Canada (Yukon)	A member of Spiriferida belonging to the family Choristitidae.
Alebusirhynchia vorosi	Sp. nov	Valid	Baeza-Carratalá, Dulai & Sandoval	Early Jurassic		Spain	A member of Rhynchonellida.
Alekseevathyris	Gen. et sp. nov	Valid	Baranov & Blodgett	Devonian (Givetian)	Coronados Volcanics	United States (Alaska)	A member of Terebratulida belonging to the family Stringocephalidae. The type species is A. coronadosensis.
Altaethyrella tarimensis	Sp. nov	Valid	Sproat & Zhan	Ordovician (late Katian)	Hadabulaktag Formation	China	
Ambocoelia yidadeensis	Sp. nov	Valid	Zhang & Ma	Devonian (Frasnian)	Yidade Formation	China	
Arpaspirifer	Gen. et comb. nov	Valid	Gretchishnikova in Alekseeva et al.	Devonian (Famennian)		Armenia; Azerbaijan	A member of the family Cyrtosririferidae. The type species is "Spirifer" latus Abrahamian (1974).
Aulacella finitima	Sp. nov	Valid	Alekseeva & Gretchishnikova in Alekseeva et al.	Devonian (Eifelian–Givetian)		Azerbaijan	
Betaneospirifer stepanovi	Sp. nov	Valid	Poletaev	Carboniferous		Russia (Bashkortostan)	A member of the family Trigonotretidae.
Biernatium sucoi	Sp. nov	Valid	García-Alcalde	Devonian (Givetian)	Portilla Formation	Spain	A member of Orthida belonging to the family Mystrophoridae.
Broggeria omaguaca	Sp. nov	Valid	Benedetto, Lavie & Muñoz	Ordovician (Tremadocian)		Argentina	
Buxtonia sulcata	Sp. nov	Valid	Waterhouse	Carboniferous	Blackie Formation	Canada (Yukon)	A member of Productida belonging to the superfamily Productoidea and the family Buxtoniidae.
Callaiapsida divitiae	Sp. nov	Valid	Waterhouse	Carboniferous	Jungle Creek Formation	Canada (Yukon)	A member of Rhynchonellida belonging to the family Stenoscismatidae.
Calliprotonia kerrae	Sp. nov	Valid	Waterhouse	Carboniferous	Jungle Creek Formation	Canada (Yukon)	A member of Productida belonging to the family Echinoconchidae.
Calliprotonia umbonalis	Sp. nov	Valid	Waterhouse	Permian	Jungle Creek Formation	Canada (Yukon)	A member of Productida belonging to the family Echinoconchidae.
Chelononia minimauris	Sp. nov	Valid	Waterhouse	Carboniferous	Jungle Creek Formation	Canada (Yukon)	A member of Strophomenata belonging to the superfamily Orthotetoidea and the family Schuchertellidae.
Churkinella	Gen. et sp. nov	Valid	Baranov & Blodgett	Devonian (Givetian)	Coronados Volcanics	United States (Alaska)	A member of Terebratulida belonging to the family Stringocephalidae. The type species is C. craigensis.
Cingulodermis pustulatus	Sp. nov	Valid	Mergl	Devonian (Emsian)		Morocco	
Commarginalia norrisi	Sp. nov	Valid	Waterhouse	Permian	Jungle Creek Formation	Canada (Yukon)	A member of Productida belonging to the superfamily Proboscidelloidea and the family Paucispinauriidae.
Composita largitas	Sp. nov	Valid	Waterhouse	Carboniferous	Wahoo Formation	Canada (Yukon)	
Coronadothyris	Gen. et sp. nov	Valid	Baranov & Blodgett	Devonian (Givetian)	Coronados Volcanics	United States (Alaska)	A member of Terebratulida belonging to the family Stringocephalidae. The type species is C. mica.
Costisorthis lisae	Sp. nov	Valid	García-Alcalde	Devonian (Givetian)	Candás Formation	Spain	A member of Orthida belonging to the family Dalmanellidae.
Cyrtiorina houi	Sp. nov	Valid	Zong & Ma	Devonian (Famennian)	Hongguleleng Formation	China	A brachiopod belonging to the group Spiriferida.
Cyrtospirifer dansikensis	Sp. nov	Valid	Afanasjeva in Alekseeva et al.	Devonian (Famennian)		Azerbaijan	
Dalejina aulacelliformis	Sp. nov	Valid	Mergl	Devonian (Emsian)		Morocco	
Datnella	Gen. et comb. nov	Valid	Baranov	Early Devonian		Russia	A member of Atrypida. The type species is D. datnensis (Baranov, 1995).
Deltachania elongata	Sp. nov	Valid	Waterhouse	Carboniferous	Blackie Formation	Canada (Yukon)	A member of Athyrida belonging to the superfamily Athyroidea.
Desquamatia globosa jozefkae	Subsp. nov	Valid	Baliński in Skompski et al.	Devonian (Givetian–Frasnian boundary)	Szydłówek Beds	Poland	A member of Atrypida belonging to the family Atrypidae.
Diazoma ghyumuschlugensis	Sp. nov	Valid	Oleneva in Alekseeva et al.	Devonian (Frasnian)		Azerbaijan	
Dichospirifer felixi	Sp. nov	Valid	Gretchishnikova in Alekseeva et al.	Devonian (Famennian)		Azerbaijan	
Dutroproductus	Gen. et sp. nov	Valid	Waterhouse	Permian	Jungle Creek Formation	Canada (Yukon)	A member of Productida belonging to the superfamily Productoidea and the family Retariidae. The type species is D. dutroi.
Echinalosia minuta	Sp. nov	Valid	Waterhouse	Permian	Jungle Creek Formation	Canada (Yukon)	A member of Productida belonging to the superfamily Strophalosioidea and the family Dasyalosiidae.
Echinaria circularis	Sp. nov	Valid	Waterhouse	Permian	Jungle Creek Formation	Canada (Yukon)	A member of Productida belonging to the family Echinoconchidae.
Eopholidostrophia (Megapholidostrophia) gigas	Sp. nov	Valid	Strusz & Percival	Silurian (Wenlock)		Australia	
Eressella	Gen. et comb. nov	Valid	Halamski & Baliński	Middle Devonian		Germany; Morocco; Poland	A member of Rhynchonellida belonging to the family Uncinulidae. The type species is "Rhynchonella" coronata Kayser (1871).
Eridmatina	Gen. et comb. nov	Valid	Waterhouse	Carboniferous and Permian	Gaptank Formation	Canada (Yukon); United States	A member of Spiriferida belonging to the family Spiriferellidae. The type species is "Eridmatus" marathonensis Cooper & Grant (1976); genus also includes "Eridmatus" petita Waterhouse & Waddington (1982)
Ettrainia	Gen. et sp. nov	Valid	Waterhouse	Permian	Jungle Creek Formation	Canada (Yukon)	A member of Spiriferida belonging to the superfamily Choristitoidea and the family Palaeochoristitidae. The type species is E. costellata.
Flexaria echinata	Sp. nov	Valid	Waterhouse	Carboniferous	Hart River Formation	Canada (Yukon)	A member of Productida belonging to the superfamily Productoidea and the family Buxtoniidae.
Forticosta	Gen. et sp. nov	Valid	Waterhouse	Carboniferous	Jungle Creek Formation	Canada (Yukon)	A member of Spiriferida belonging to the superfamily Spiriferoidea and the family Neospiriferidae. The type species is F. transversa.
Gemmulicosta undulata	Sp. nov	Valid	Waterhouse	Carboniferous	Jungle Creek Formation	Canada (Yukon)	A member of Productida belonging to the superfamily Productoidea and the family Buxtoniidae.
Gypidulina grandis	Sp. nov	Valid	Alekseeva & Gretchishnikova in Alekseeva et al.	Devonian (Eifelian–Givetian)		Azerbaijan	
Harkeria elongata	Sp. nov	Valid	Waterhouse	Carboniferous	Jungle Creek Formation	Canada (Yukon)	A member of Productida belonging to the family Yakovleviidae.
Harkeria sulcoprofundus	Sp. nov	Valid	Waterhouse	Permian	Jungle Creek Formation	Canada (Yukon)	A member of Productida belonging to the family Yakovleviidae.
Hartea	Gen. et sp. nov	Junior homonym	Waterhouse	Carboniferous	Hart River Formation	Canada (Yukon)	A member of Spiriferida belonging to the family Ambocoeliidae. The type species is H. venustus. The generic name is preoccupied by Hartea Wright (1865).
Heella	Gen. et comb. nov	Valid	Waterhouse	Permian		China	A member of Spiriferida belonging to the family Ambocoeliidae. The type species is "Attenuatella" mengi He, Shi, Feng & Peng (2007)
Heteralosia scotti	Sp. nov	Valid	Waterhouse	Carboniferous	Jungle Creek Formation	Canada (Yukon)	A member of Productida belonging to the superfamily Strophalosioidea and the family Strophalosiidae.
Hustedia quadrifidus	Sp. nov	Valid	Waterhouse	Permian	Jungle Creek Formation	Canada (Yukon)	A member of Rhynchonellata belonging to the group Retziida and the family Retziidae.
Hustedia trifida	Sp. nov	Valid	Waterhouse	Carboniferous	Jungle Creek Formation	Canada (Yukon)	A member of Rhynchonellata belonging to the group Retziida and the family Retziidae.
Isorthis (Arcualla) delegatensis	Sp. nov	Valid	Strusz & Percival	Silurian (Wenlock)		Australia	
Jagtithyris	Gen. et comb. nov	Valid	Simon & Mottequin	Late Cretaceous (Maastrichtian)		Netherlands	A relative of Leptothyrellopsis, assigned to the new family Jagtithyrididae. Genus includes "Terebratella (Morrisia?)" suessi Bosquet (1859).
Junglelomia simplex	Sp. nov	Valid	Waterhouse	Carboniferous	Jungle Creek Formation	Canada (Yukon)	A member of Spiriferida belonging to the superfamily Choristitoidea and the family Palaeochoristitidae.
Juxathyris subcircularis	Sp. nov	Valid	Wu et al.	Permian (Changhsingian)	Changxing Formation	China	A member of Athyridida.
Komiella bitteri	Sp. nov	Valid	Waterhouse	Carboniferous	Jungle Creek Formation	Canada (Yukon)	A member of the family Rugosochonetidae.
Krotovia norfordi	Sp. nov	Valid	Waterhouse	Carboniferous and Permian	Jungle Creek Formation	Canada (Yukon)	A member of Productida belonging to the family Echinoconchidae.
Kukulkanus	Gen. et sp. nov	Valid	Torres-Martínez, Sour-Tovar & Barragán	Permian (Artinskian–Kungurian)	Paso Hondo Formation	Mexico	A brachiopod belonging to the group Productida and the family Productidae. The type species is K. spinosus.
"Kutorginella" primigenius	Sp. nov	Valid	Waterhouse	Carboniferous	Hart River Formation	Canada (Yukon)	A member of Productida belonging to the superfamily Productoidea and the family Retariidae.
Latisulcus	Gen. et comb. nov	Valid	Waterhouse	Permian	Bone Spring Formation	United States (Texas)	A member of Rhynchonellata belonging to the group Retziida and the family Retziidae. The type species is "Hustedia" hessensis King (1931)
Leiochonetes onimarensis	Sp. nov	Valid	Tazawa	Carboniferous (Mississippian)	Hikoroichi Formation	Japan	A member of the family Rugosochonetidae belonging to the subfamily Svalbardiinae.
Leptaena (Leptaena) australis	Sp. nov	Valid	Strusz & Percival	Silurian (Wenlock)		Australia	
Leurosina katasumiensis	Sp. nov	Valid	Afanasjeva, Jun-Ichi & Yukio	Permian (Kungurian)	Nabeyama Formation	Japan	A member of Chonetida belonging to the family Rugosochonetidae.
Levipustula canadensis	Sp. nov	Valid	Waterhouse	Carboniferous	Blackie Formation	Canada (Yukon)	A member of Strophalosiidina belonging to the superfamily Scacchinelloidea and the family Levipustulidae.
Martinezchaconia	Gen. et sp. nov	Valid	Torres-Martínez & Sour-Tovar	Carboniferous (Bashkirian-Moscovian)	Ixtaltepec Formation	Mexico	A member of Productida belonging to the family Linoproductidae. The type species is M. luisae.
Meristorygma donakovae	Sp. nov	Valid	Poletaev	Carboniferous	Kizil Formation	Russia	A member of the family Brachythyrididae.
Mirandifera	Gen. et comb. nov	Valid	Waterhouse	Permian	Cathedral Mountain Formation	Canada (Yukon); United States (Texas)	A member of Spiriferida belonging to the family Martiniidae. The type species is "Martinia" miranda Cooper & Grant (1976); genus also includes "Martinia" wolfcampensis King (1931)
Misunithyris	Gen. et sp. nov	Valid	Baeza-Carratalá, Pérez-Valera & Pérez-Valera	Middle Triassic (Ladinian)	Siles Formation	Spain	A brachiopod belonging to the group Terebratellidina and to the superfamily Zeillerioidea. The type species is M. goyi.
Morinorhynchus tucksoni	Sp. nov	Valid	Strusz & Percival	Silurian (Wenlock)		Australia	
Muirwoodiciana	Gen. et sp. nov	Valid	Waterhouse	Carboniferous	Blackie Formation	Canada (Yukon)	A member of Productida belonging to the family Yakovleviidae. The type species is M. inexpectans.
Musalitinispira	Gen. et sp. nov	Valid	Baranov	Early Devonian		Russia	A member of Atrypida. The type species is M. dogdensis.
Mysteronia	Gen. et sp. nov	Valid	Waterhouse	Carboniferous	Blackie Formation	Canada (Yukon)	A member of Rhynchonellida belonging to the superfamily Rhynchoporoidea and the family Rhynchoporidae. The type species is M. mysticus.
Nahoniella decorus	Sp. nov	Valid	Waterhouse	Carboniferous	Jungle Creek Formation	Canada (Yukon)	A member of Spiriferinida belonging to the group Syringothyridina and the family Licharewiidae.
Nassichukia	Gen. et sp. nov	Valid	Waterhouse	Carboniferous	Jungle Creek Formation	Canada (Yukon)	A member of Productida belonging to the superfamily Productoidea and the family Buxtoniidae. The type species is N. nodosa.
Nazeriproductus lazarevi	Sp. nov	Valid	Waterhouse	Carboniferous	Jungle Creek Formation	Canada (Yukon)	A member of Productida belonging to the superfamily Productoidea and the family Retariidae.
Neochonetes (Huangichonetes) matsukawensis	Sp. nov	Valid	Tazawa & Araki	Permian (Wordian)	Kamiyasse Formation	Japan	A member of the family Rugosochonetidae.
Newberria alaskensis	Sp. nov	Valid	Baranov & Blodgett	Devonian (Givetian)	Coronados Volcanics	United States (Alaska)	A member of Terebratulida belonging to the family Stringocephalidae.
Nucleospira quidongensis	Sp. nov	Valid	Strusz & Percival	Silurian (Wenlock)		Australia	
Ogilviecoelia initiatus	Sp. nov	Valid	Waterhouse	Permian	Jungle Creek Formation	Canada (Yukon)	A member of Spiriferida belonging to the family Ambocoeliidae.
Ogilviecoelia shii	Sp. nov	Valid	Waterhouse	Permian	Jungle Creek Formation	Canada (Yukon)	A member of Spiriferida belonging to the family Ambocoeliidae.
Opsiconidion bouceki	Sp. nov	Valid	Mergl, Frýda & Kubajko	Silurian (Ludfordian)	Kopanina Formation	Czech Republic	A member of Acrotretoidea belonging to the family Biernatidae.
Opsiconidion parephemerus	Sp. nov	Valid	Mergl, Frýda & Kubajko	Silurian (Ludfordian)	Kopanina Formation	Czech Republic	A member of Acrotretoidea belonging to the family Biernatidae.
Orthotetes dorsosulcata	Sp. nov	Valid	Waterhouse	Carboniferous	Jungle Creek Formation	Canada (Yukon)	A member of Strophomenata belonging to the superfamily Orthotetoidea and the family Orthotetidae.
Papulifera	Gen. et sp. nov	Valid	Waterhouse	Carboniferous	Blackie Formation	Canada (Yukon)	A member of Spiriferida belonging to the family Martiniidae. The type species is P. plana.
Paucispinifera abramovi	Sp. nov	Valid	Waterhouse	Carboniferous	Jungle Creek Formation	Canada (Yukon)	A member of Productida belonging to the family Paucispiniferidae.
Paucispinifera carboniferica	Sp. nov	Valid	Waterhouse	Carboniferous	Jungle Creek Formation	Canada (Yukon)	A member of Productida belonging to the family Paucispiniferidae.
Paucispinifera sulcata	Sp. nov	Valid	Waterhouse	Permian	Jungle Creek Formation	Canada (Yukon)	A member of Productida belonging to the family Paucispiniferidae.
Pinguispirifer kesskess	Sp. nov	Valid	Mergl	Devonian (Emsian)		Morocco	
Piridiorhynchus jafariani	Sp. nov	Valid	Baranov et al.	Devonian (Famennian)	Khoshyeilagh Formation	Iran	A member of Rhynchonellida belonging to the family Trigonirhynchiidae.
Plicatospiriferella undulata	Sp. nov	Valid	Waterhouse	Permian	Jungle Creek Formation	Canada (Yukon)	A member of Spiriferida belonging to the family Spiriferellidae.
Poletaevia	Gen. et comb. nov	Valid	Waterhouse	Carboniferous	Hare Fiord Formation	Canada (Nunavut)	A member of Productida belonging to the superfamily Paucispiniferoidea and the family Anidanthidae. The type species is "Liraria" paucispina Carter & Poletaev (1998)
Pripyatispirifer caucasius	Sp. nov	Valid	Afanasjeva in Alekseeva et al.	Devonian (Frasnian)		Azerbaijan	
Protoanidanthus monstratus	Sp. nov	Valid	Waterhouse	Carboniferous	Blackie Formation	Canada (Yukon)	A member of Productida belonging to the superfamily Paucispiniferoidea and the family Anidanthidae.
Protoanidanthus nichollsi	Sp. nov	Valid	Waterhouse	Permian	Jungle Creek Formation	Canada (Yukon)	A member of Productida belonging to the superfamily Paucispiniferoidea and the family Anidanthidae.
Pumilusia	Gen. et comb. nov	Valid	Waterhouse	Carboniferous	La Prasada Formation	United States (New Mexico)	A member of Productida belonging to the superfamily Linoproductoidea and the family Ovatiidae. The type species is "Linoproductus" pumilus Sutherland & Harlow (1973)
Punctospirifer iwatensis	Sp. nov	Valid	Tazawa	Carboniferous (Mississippian)	Hikoroichi Formation	Japan	A member of Spiriferinida belonging to the family Punctospiriferidae.
Resserella dagnensis	Sp. nov	Valid	Alekseeva & Gretchishnikova in Alekseeva et al.	Devonian (Emsian–Eifelian)		Azerbaijan	
Reticulariopsis rotunda	Sp. nov	Valid	Oleneva in Alekseeva et al.	Devonian (Givetian)		Azerbaijan	
Rhipidomella arpensis	Sp. nov	Valid	Alekseeva & Gretchishnikova in Alekseeva et al.	Devonian (Givetian)		Azerbaijan	
Rhipidomella borealis	Sp. nov	Valid	Waterhouse	Carboniferous	Wahoo Formation	Canada (Yukon)	A member of Orthida belonging to the family Rhipidomellidae.
Rhynchopora grigorievae	Sp. nov	Valid	Waterhouse	Permian	Jungle Creek Formation	Canada (Yukon)	A member of Rhynchonellida belonging to the superfamily Rhynchoporoidea and the family Rhynchoporidae.
Rhynchoporusia	Gen. et sp. nov	Valid	Waterhouse	Carboniferous	Hart River Formation	Canada (Yukon)	A member of Rhynchonellida belonging to the superfamily Rhynchoporoidea and the family Rhynchoporidae. The type species is R. multiplicata.
Rorespirifer prodigium	Sp. nov	Valid	Waterhouse	Carboniferous	Blackie Formation	Canada (Yukon)	A member of Spiriferida belonging to the superfamily Ingelarelloidea and the family Rorespiriferidae.
Rugaria arcula	Sp. nov	Valid	Waterhouse	Carboniferous	Jungle Creek Formation	Canada (Yukon)	A member of the family Rugosochonetidae.
Rugivestigia	Gen. et sp. nov	Valid	Waterhouse	Permian	Jungle Creek Formation	Canada (Yukon)	A member of Productida belonging to the family Paucispiniferidae. The type species is R. commarginalis.
Rugosochonetes multistriatus	Sp. nov	Valid	Afanasjeva in Alekseeva et al.	Carboniferous (Tournaisian)		Azerbaijan	
Saltospirifer gibberosus	Sp. nov	Valid	Waterhouse	Carboniferous	Blackie Formation	Canada (Yukon)	A member of Spiriferida belonging to the superfamily Spiriferoidea and the family Spiriferidae.
Sangredonia alaminata	Sp. nov	Valid	Waterhouse	Permian	Jungle Creek Formation	Canada (Yukon)	A member of Productida belonging to the family Horridoniidae.
Sarytchevinella praecursor	Sp. nov	Valid	Waterhouse	Carboniferous	Jungle Creek Formation	Canada (Yukon)	A member of Productida belonging to the superfamily Linoproductoidea and the family Striatiferidae.
Schizambon langei	Sp. nov	Valid	Freeman, Miller & Dattilo	Cambrian–Ordovician boundary		United States (Texas)	A linguliform brachiopod.
Schizophoria lata	Sp. nov	Valid	Alekseeva & Gretchishnikova in Alekseeva et al.	Devonian (Emsian–Eifelian)		Azerbaijan	
Schizophoria schnuri altera	Subsp. nov	Valid	Alekseeva & Gretchishnikova in Alekseeva et al.	Devonian (Givetian)		Azerbaijan	
Septatrypa tumulorum	Sp. nov	Valid	Baliński & Halamski	Devonian (Emsian)		Morocco	
Septospirifer hughi	Sp. nov	Valid	Waterhouse	Permian	Jungle Creek Formation	Canada (Yukon)	A member of Spiriferida belonging to the superfamily Spiriferoidea and the family Neospiriferidae.
Sieberella parva	Sp. nov	Valid	Alekseeva & Gretchishnikova in Alekseeva et al.	Devonian (Emsian–Eifelian)		Azerbaijan	
Sphenospira dansikensis	Sp. nov	Valid	Gretchishnikova in Alekseeva et al.	Devonian (Famennian)		Azerbaijan	
Spinatrypina (Spinatrypina) krivensis	Sp. nov	Valid	Baranov	Early Devonian		Russia	A member of Atrypida.
Spinocyrtia irinae	Sp. nov	Valid	Afanasjeva in Alekseeva et al.	Devonian (Eifelian and Givetian)		Azerbaijan	
Spirelytha biakovi	Sp. nov	Valid	Waterhouse	Carboniferous	Jungle Creek Formation	Canada (Yukon)	A member of Spiriferida belonging to the superfamily Elitoidea and the family Toryniferidae.
Spiriferinaella simplicata	Sp. nov	Valid	Waterhouse	Carboniferous and Permian	Jungle Creek Formation	Canada (Yukon)	A member of Spiriferida belonging to the superfamily Paeckelmanelloidea and the family Pterospiriferidae.
Stataria	Gen. et comb. nov	Valid	Waterhouse	Permian	Cathedral Mountain Formation	United States (Texas)	A member of Rhynchonellata belonging to the group Retziida and the family Retziidae. The type species is "Hustedia" stataria Cooper & Grant (1976)
Stenorhynchia ulrici	Sp. nov	Valid	Halamski & Baliński	Devonian (Emsian)		Morocco	
Tegulispirifer? placitus	Sp. nov	Valid	Waterhouse	Carboniferous	Jungle Creek Formation	Canada (Yukon)	A member of Spiriferida belonging to the superfamily Spiriferoidea and the family Spiriferidae.
Tethysiella impudens	Sp. nov	Valid	Waterhouse	Permian	Jungle Creek Formation	Canada (Yukon)	A member of Productida belonging to the family Paucispiniferidae.
Thomasaria caucasica	Sp. nov	Valid	Oleneva in Alekseeva et al.	Devonian (Eifelian)		Azerbaijan	
Trigonatrypa drotae	Sp. nov	Valid	Mergl	Devonian (Emsian)		Morocco	
Tuberculatella bunnakia	Nom. nov	Valid	Waterhouse	Carboniferous		Thailand	A member of Productida belonging to the family Avoniidae; a replacement name for Tuberculatella tuberculata Waterhouse (1982).
Tubersulculus ovalis	Sp. nov	Valid	Waterhouse	Carboniferous	Jungle Creek Formation	Canada (Yukon)	A member of Productida belonging to the family Echinoconchidae.
Tumarinia solominae	Sp. nov	Valid	Waterhouse	Carboniferous	Jungle Creek Formation	Canada (Yukon)	A member of Spiriferinida belonging to the group Syringothyridina and the family Licharewiidae.
Undispirifer dansikensis	Sp. nov	Valid	Oleneva in Alekseeva et al.	Devonian (Eifelian)		Azerbaijan	
Unispirifer arpensis	Sp. nov	Valid	Afanasjeva in Alekseeva et al.	Carboniferous (Tournaisian)		Azerbaijan	
Villaconcha planiconcha	Sp. nov	Valid	Waterhouse	Permian	Jungle Creek Formation	Canada (Yukon)	A member of Productida belonging to the superfamily Echinoconchoidea and the family Waagenoconchidae.
Yanzaria	Gen. et comb. et sp. nov	Valid	Waterhouse	Carboniferous and Permian	Fenestella Shales	Canada (Yukon); India	A member of Rhynchonellida belonging to the family Tetracameridae. The type species is "Camarophoria" dowhatensis Diener (1915); genus also includes new species Y. solitarius.
Yukonalosia	Gen. et sp. nov	Valid	Waterhouse	Carboniferous	Jungle Creek Formation	Canada (Yukon)	A member of Productida belonging to the superfamily Strophalosioidea and the family Dasyalosiidae. The type species is Y. arctica.
Zaigunrostrum nakhichevanense	Sp. nov	Valid	Pakhnevich	Devonian (Famennian)		Azerbaijan	A brachiopod belonging to the group Rhynchonellida and the family Trigonirhynchiidae.
Zezinia	Gen. et sp. nov	Valid	Pakhnevich	Devonian (Frasnian)		Azerbaijan	A brachiopod belonging to the group Rhynchonellida and the family Uncinulidae. The type species is Z. multicostata.

== Conodonts ==
=== Research ===
- A study testing the proposed models of growth of conodont elements is published by Shirley et al. (2018).
- A study on the histological sections of Ordovician and Permian conodont dental elements from the Bell Canyon Formation (Texas, United States), Harding Sandstone (Colorado, United States), Ali Bashi Formation (Iran) and Canadian Arctic, examining those fossils for the presence and distribution of soft tissue biomarkers, is published by Terrill, Henderson & Anderson (2018).
- A study evaluating the δ^{18}O variation within a species-rich conodont assemblage from the Ordovician (Floian) Factory Cove Member of the Shallow Bay Formation, Cow Head Group (western Newfoundland, Canada), as well as assessing the implications of these data for determining the paleothermometry of ancient oceans and conodont ecologic models, is published by Wheeley et al. (2018).
- A study on the body size and diversity of Carnian conodonts from South China and their implications for inferring the biotic and environmental changes during the Carnian Pluvial Event is published by Zhang et al. (2018).
- A study assessing the similarity of late Paleozoic to Triassic conodont faunas known from the Cache Creek terrane (Canada) is published by Golding (2018).
- Reconstruction of the multi-element apparatus of the Middle Triassic conodont from British Columbia (Canada) belonging to the Neogondolella regalis group within the genus Neogondolella is presented by Golding (2018).
- Reconstruction of the number and arrangement of elements in the apparatus of Hindeodus parvus published by Zhang et al. (2017) is criticized by Agematsu, Golding & Orchard (2018); Purnell et al. (2018) defend their original conclusions.
- A cluster of icriodontid conodonts belonging to the species Caudicriodus woschmidti, providing new information on the apparatus structure of icriodontid conodonts, is described from the Lower Devonian sediments in southern Burgenland (Austria) by Suttner, Kido & Briguglio (2018).
- A study on the species belonging to the genus Neognathodus, evaluating whether previously defined morphotype groups are reliably distinct from one another, is published by Zimmerman, Johnson & Polly (2018).

=== New taxa ===
Name	Novelty	Status	Authors	Age	Type locality	Country	Notes
Ancyrogondolella diakowi	Sp. nov	Valid	Orchard	Late Triassic (Norian)	Pardonet Formation	Canada (British Columbia)	A member of the family Gondolellidae.
Ancyrogondolella equalis	Sp. nov	Valid	Orchard	Late Triassic (Norian)	Pardonet Formation	Canada (British Columbia)	A member of the family Gondolellidae.
Ancyrogondolella inequalis	Sp. nov	Valid	Orchard	Late Triassic (Norian)	Pardonet Formation	Canada (British Columbia)	A member of the family Gondolellidae.
Ancyrogondolella? praespiculata	Sp. nov	Valid	Orchard	Late Triassic (Norian)	Pardonet Formation	Canada (British Columbia)	A member of the family Gondolellidae.
Ancyrogondolella transformis	Sp. nov	Valid	Orchard	Late Triassic (Norian)	Pardonet Formation	Canada (British Columbia)	A member of the family Gondolellidae.
Baltoniodus cooperi	Sp. nov	Valid	Carlorosi, Sarmiento & Heredia	Ordovician (Dapingian)	Santa Gertrudis Formation	Argentina	
Declinognathodus intermedius	Sp. nov	Valid	Hu, Qi & Nemyrovska	Carboniferous		China	
Declinognathodus tuberculosus	Sp. nov	Valid	Hu, Qi & Nemyrovska	Carboniferous		China	
Gedikella	Gen. et sp. nov	Valid	Kılıç, Plasencia & Önder	Middle Triassic (Anisian)		Turkey	A member of the family Gondolellidae. The type species is G. quadrata.
Gnathodus mirousei	Sp. nov	Valid	Sanz-López & Blanco-Ferrera	Carboniferous (Mississippian)	Alba Formation; Aspe-Brousset Formation; Black Rock Limestone	Belgium; China; Ireland; Italy; Spain; United Kingdom United States (Illinois)	
Idiognathodus abdivitus	Sp. nov	Valid	Hogancamp & Barrick	Carboniferous	Atrasado Formation; Eudora Shale	United States (New Mexico)	Originally described as a species of Idiognathodus, but subsequently transferred to the genus Heckelina.
Idiognathodus centralis	Sp. nov	Valid	Hogancamp & Barrick	Carboniferous	Atrasado Formation; Eudora Shale	United States (New Mexico)	
Idiognathodus sweeti	Sp. nov	Valid	Hogancamp & Barrick	Carboniferous	Atrasado Formation; Eudora Shale	United States (New Mexico)	
Idiognathoides chaagulootus	Sp. nov	Valid	Frederick & Barrick	Carboniferous (early Pennsylvanian)	Ladrones Limestone	United States (Alaska)	
Kamuellerella rectangularis	Sp. nov	Valid	Kılıç, Plasencia & Önder	Middle Triassic (Anisian)		Turkey	A member of the family Gondolellidae.
Ketinella goermueshi	Sp. nov	Valid	Kılıç, Plasencia & Önder	Middle Triassic (Anisian)		Turkey	A member of the family Gondolellidae.
Magnigondolella	Gen. et 5 sp. et comb. nov	Valid	Golding & Orchard	Middle Triassic (Anisian)	Favret Formation; Toad Formation	Canada (British Columbia); China; United States (Nevada)	A member of the family Gondolellidae. The type species is M. salomae; genus also includes new species M. alexanderi, M. cyri, M. julii and M. nebuchadnezzari, as well as "Neogondolella" regale Mosher (1970) and "Neogondolella" dilacerata Golding & Orchard (2016).
Mesogondolella hendersoni	Sp. nov	Valid	Yuan, Zhang & Shen	Permian (Changhsingian)	Selong Group	China	
Mockina? spinosa	Sp. nov	Valid	Orchard	Late Triassic (Norian)	Pardonet Formation	Canada (British Columbia)	A member of the family Gondolellidae.
Neopolygnathus fibula	Sp. nov	Valid	Hartenfels & Becker	Devonian (Famennian)		Morocco	
Neospathodus arcus	Sp. nov	Valid	Maekawa in Maekawa, Komatsu & Koike	Early Triassic	Taho Formation	Japan	
Novispathodus shirokawai	Sp. nov	Valid	Maekawa in Maekawa, Komatsu & Koike	Early Triassic	Taho Formation	Japan	
Novispathodus tahoensis	Sp. nov	Valid	Maekawa in Maekawa, Komatsu & Koike	Early Triassic	Taho Formation	Japan	
'Ozarkodina'? chenae	Sp. nov	Valid	Lu et al.	Devonian (Emsian)	Ertang Formation	China	
'Ozarkodina'? wuxuanensis	Sp. nov	Valid	Lu et al.	Devonian (Emsian)	Ertang Formation	China	
Polygnathus linguiformis saharicus	Subsp. nov	Valid	Narkiewicz & Königshof	Devonian (late Eifelian–middle Givetian)	Ispena Formation; Si Phai Formation	Morocco; Spain; Tajikistan; Turkey; Vietnam	
Polygnathus linguiformis vietnamicus	Subsp. nov	Valid	Narkiewicz & Königshof	Devonian (Givetian)	Plum Brook Shale; Si Phai Formation	Germany; Morocco; United States (Ohio); Vietnam	
Polygnathus praeinversus	Sp. nov	Valid	Lu et al.	Devonian (Emsian)	Ertang Formation	China	
Polygnathus rhenanus siphai	Subsp. nov	Valid	Narkiewicz & Königshof	Devonian (Givetian)	Candás Formation; Si Phai Formation	China; Morocco; Spain; Vietnam	
Polygnathus xylus bacbo	Subsp. nov	Valid	Narkiewicz & Königshof	Devonian (Givetian)	Si Phai Formation	Vietnam	
Pseudognathodus posadachaconae	Sp. nov	Valid	Sanz-López, Blanco-Ferrera & Miller	Carboniferous (Mississippian)	Prestatyn Limestone	United Kingdom	A member of the family Gnathodontidae.
Pseudopolygnathus primus tafilensis	Subsp. nov	Valid	Hartenfels & Becker	Devonian (Famennian)		Morocco	
Pustulognathus	Gen. et 2 sp. nov	Valid	Golding & Orchard in Golding	Permian (Guadalupian to Lopingian)	Copley Limestone; Horsefeed Formation	Canada (British Columbia); China?	A member of the family Sweetognathidae. The type species is P. monticola; genus also includes P. vigilans.
Quadralella (Quadralella) postica	Sp. nov	Valid	Zhang et al.	Late Triassic (Carnian)		China	
Quadralella robusta	Sp. nov	Valid	Zhang et al.	Late Triassic (Carnian)		China	
Quadralella wignalli	Sp. nov	Valid	Zhang et al.	Late Triassic (Carnian)		China	
Quadralella yongningensis	Sp. nov	Valid	Zhang et al.	Late Triassic (Carnian)		China	
Scandodus choii	Sp. nov	Valid	Lee	Ordovician (Darriwilian)		South Korea	
Sweetognathus duplex	Sp. nov	Valid	Read & Nestell	Permian (Sakmarian)	Riepe Spring Limestone	United States (Nevada)	
Sweetognathus wardlawi	Sp. nov	Valid	Read & Nestell	Permian (Sakmarian)	Riepe Spring Limestone	United States (Nevada)	
"Tortodus" sparlingi	Sp. nov	Valid	Aboussalam & Becker in Brett et al.	Devonian (Givetian)		Poland; Spain; United States (Kentucky; Ohio)	
Walliserognathus	Gen. et comb. nov	Valid	Corradini & Corriga	Silurian (Ludlow)	Henryhouse Formation; Roberts Mountains Formation	Austria; China; Hungary; Italy; Spain; Sweden; United States (Nevada; Oklahoma)	A member of the family Spathognathodontidae; a new genus for Spathognathodus inclinatus posthamatus Walliser (1964), raised to the rank of the species Walliserognathus posthamatus.

== Synapsids ==
=== Non-mammalian synapsids ===
==== Research ====
- A description of the postcranial material referable to the caseid species Ennatosaurus tecton is published by Romano, Brocklehurst & Fröbisch (2018).
- A study on the anatomy and phylogenetic relationships of Milosaurus mccordi is published by Brocklehurst & Fröbisch (2018).
- A skull of a juvenile specimen of Anteosaurus magnificus is described from the Permian Abrahamskraal Formation (South Africa) by Kruger, Rubidge & Abdala (2018).
- A study on the evolution of the trigeminal nerve innervation in anomodonts is published by Benoit et al. (2018).
- A study on the stable oxygen and carbon isotope compositions of dentine apatite in the teeth of twenty-eight specimens of Diictodon feliceps, and on their implications for inferring the potential role of climate in driving the late Capitanian mass extinction of terrestrial tetrapods, is published by Rey et al. (2018).
- Description of the anatomy of six new skulls of the dicynodont Abajudon kaayai from the Permian (Guadalupian) lower Madumabisa Mudstone Formation (Zambia) and a study on the phylogenetic relationships of the species is published by Olroyd, Sidor & Angielczyk (2018).
- A study on the anatomy of the bony labyrinth of the specimens of the dicynodont genus Endothiodon collected from the Permian K5 Formation (Mozambique), comparing it with the closely related genus Niassodon, is published by Araújo et al. (2018).
- A study on the taphonomic history of a monotypic bonebed composed by several individuals attributable to the dicynodont Dinodontosaurus collected in a classic Middle Triassic locality in Brazil, and on its implications for inferring possible gregarious behaviour in Dinodontosaurus, is published online by Ugalde et al. (2018).
- Redescription of the dicynodont genus Sangusaurus and a study on its feeding system and phylogenetic relationships is published by Angielczyk, Hancox & Nabavizadeh (2018).
- Partial hindlimb of a dicynodont nearing the size of Stahleckeria potens is described from the Triassic Lifua Member of the Manda Beds (Tanzania) by Kammerer, Angielczyk & Nesbitt (2018), representing the largest dicynodont postcranial element from the Manda Beds reported so far.
- Description of plant remains and palynomorphs preserved in the coprolites produced by large dicynodonts from the Triassic Chañares Formation (Argentina), and a study on their implications for inferring the diet of dicynodonts, is published by Perez Loinaze et al. (2018).
- Tetrapod tracks, probably produced by dicynodonts, are described from the Upper Triassic Vera Formation of the Los Menucos Group (Argentina) by Citton et al. (2018).
- A study on the age of putative Rhaetian dicynodont from Lipie Śląskie (Poland) is published online by Racki & Lucas (2018), who consider it more likely that this dicynodont was of Norian age.
- A study on the anatomy of the skull of Cynariops robustus is published by Bendel et al. (2018).
- A study on rates of enamel development in a range of non-mammalian cynodont species, inferred from incremental markings, is published by O'Meara, Dirks & Martinelli (2018).
- Description of the morphology of the skull of Cynosaurus suppostus and a study on the phylogenetic relationships of the species is published by van den Brandt & Abdala (2018).
- Fossils of Cynognathus crateronotus are described for the first time from the Triassic Ntawere Formation (Zambia) and Manda Beds (Tanzania) by Wynd et al. (2018).
- A study on the postcranial anatomy of a specimen of Diademodon tetragonus recovered from the Upper Omingonde Formation (Namibia) is published by Gaetano, Mocke & Abdala (2018).
- Partial skull and postcranial skeleton of a member of the species Cricodon metabolus is described from the Triassic Ntawere Formation (Zambia) by Sidor & Hopson (2018), who also study the phylogenetic relationships of members of the family Trirachodontidae.
- A study on the musculature, posture and range of motion of the forelimb of Massetognathus pascuali is published by Lai, Biewener & Pierce (2018).
- New specimen of Trucidocynodon riograndensis, almost 20% larger than the holotype specimen, is described from the Carnian of Candelária Sequence (southern Brazil) by Stefanello et al. (2018).
- Right dentary with teeth of Prozostrodon brasiliensis is described from the Late Triassic of Brazil by Pacheco et al. (2018), representing the second known specimen of this species.
- Description of the anatomy of the postcranial skeleton of Prozostrodon brasiliensis is published by Guignard, Martinelli & Soares (2018).
- A study on the limb bone histology and life histories of Prozostrodon brasiliensis, Irajatherium hernandezi, Brasilodon quadrangularis and Brasilitherium riograndensis is published by Botha-Brink, Bento Soares & Martinelli (2018).
- A study on the origin and relationships of ictidosaurian cynodonts, i.e. tritheledontids and therioherpetids, is published by Bonaparte & Crompton (2018).
- A large (comprising at least 38 individuals) clutch of well-preserved perinates of Kayentatherium wellesi, found with a presumed maternal skeleton, is described from the Lower Jurassic sediments of the Kayenta Formation (found on lands of the Navajo Nation) by Hoffman & Rowe (2018); in light of this finding, a new interpretation of earlier records of associations between adult and juvenile cynodonts is proposed by Benoit (2019).
- Cynodont teeth (representing a brasilodontid and a Riograndia-like form) found in the Triassic locality in Brazil which also yielded the fossils of Sacisaurus agudoensis are described by Marsola et al. (2018).
- A study on the evolution of the mammalian jaw is published by Lautenschlager et al. (2018), who find no evidence for a concurrent reduction in jaw-joint stress and increase in bite force in key non-mammaliaform taxa in the cynodont–mammaliaform transition.
- Tetrapod burrows, likely produced by small eucynodonts, are described from the Triassic Chañares Formation (Argentina) by Fiorelli et al. (2018).
- A study on the morphological diversity of vertebral regions in non-mammalian synapsids, and on its implication for elucidating the evolution of anatomically distinct regions of the mammalian spines, is published by Jones et al. (2018).
- A study on teeth ontogeny in wide range of extinct synapsid lineages is published by LeBlanc et al. (2018), who interpret their findings as indicating that the ligamentous tooth attachment system is not unique to crown mammals within Synapsida.

==== New taxa ====
Name	Novelty	Status	Authors	Age	Type locality	Country	Notes	Images
Ascendonanus	Gen. et sp. nov	Valid	Spindler et al.	Permian (Sakmarian-Artinskian transition)	Chemnitz petrified forest (Leukersdorf Formation)	Germany	A member of the family Varanopidae. Genus includes new species A. nestleri.	
Gordodon	Gen. et sp. nov	Valid	Lucas, Rinehart & Celeskey	Early Permian (early Wolfcampian)	Bursum Formation	United States (New Mexico)	A member of the family Edaphosauridae. The type species is G. kraineri.	
Gorynychus	Gen. et sp. nov	Valid	Kammerer & Masyutin	Permian	Kotelnich red beds	Russia (Kirov Oblast)	A therocephalian. The type species is G. masyutinae.	
Leucocephalus	Gen. et sp. nov	Valid	Day et al.	Permian (early Wuchiapingian)	Tropidostoma Assemblage Zone of the Main Karoo Basin	South Africa	A biarmosuchian belonging to the family Burnetiidae. The type species is L. wewersi.	
Lisowicia	Gen. et sp. nov		Sulej & Niedźwiedzki	Late Triassic (late Norian-earliest Rhaetian)		Poland	A gigantic dicynodont reaching an estimated body mass of 9 tons. The type species is L. bojani. Announced in 2018; the final version of the article naming it was published in 2019.	
Microvaranops	Gen. et sp. nov	Valid	Spindler et al.	Permian (Guadalupian)	Abrahamskraal Formation	South Africa	A member of the family Varanopidae. Genus includes new species M. parentis.	
Nochnitsa	Gen. et sp. nov	Valid	Kammerer & Masyutin	Permian	Kotelnich red beds	Russia (Kirov Oblast)	A gorgonopsian. The type species is N. geminidens.	
Pentasaurus	Gen. et sp. nov	Valid	Kammerer	Late Triassic	Elliot Formation	South Africa	A dicynodont belonging to the family Stahleckeriidae. The type species is P. goggai.	
Polonodon	Gen. et sp. nov	Valid	Sulej et al.	Late Triassic (Carnian)		Poland	A non-mammaliaform eucynodont. Genus includes new species P. woznikiensis. Announced in 2018; the final version of the article naming it was published in 2020.	
Siriusgnathus	Gen. et sp. nov	Valid	Pavanatto et al.	Late Triassic (Carnian or Norian)	Santa Maria Supersequence	Brazil	A traversodontid cynodont. Genus includes new species S. niemeyerorum.	

== Other animals ==
=== Research ===
- A review and synthesis of studies on the timing and environmental context of landmark events in early animal evolution is published by Sperling & Stockey (2018).
- A study on the phylogenetic relationships of the rangeomorphs, dickinsoniomorphs and erniettomorphs as indicated by what is known of the ontogeny of the rangeomorph Charnia masoni, dickinsoniomorph Dickinsonia costata and erniettomorph Pteridinium simplex is published by Dunn, Liu & Donoghue (2018), who consider at least the rangeomorphs and dickinsoniomorphs to be metazoans.
- A study on the phylogenetic relationships of the rangeomorphs is published by Dececchi et al. (2018).
- A study on the size distribution and morphological features of a population of juvenile specimens of Dickinsonia costata from the Crisp Gorge fossil locality in the Flinders Ranges (Australia) is published by Reid, García-Bellido & Gehling (2018).
- A study on the phylogenetic relationships of Dickinsonia based on data from lipid biomarkers extracted from organically preserved Ediacaran macrofossils is published by Bobrovskiy et al. (2018), who interpret their findings as indicating that Dickinsonia was an animal.
- A study on the anatomy and phylogenetic relationships of Stromatoveris, based on data from new specimens from the Chengjiang Konservat-Lagerstätte (China), is published by Hoyal Cuthill & Han (2018), who interpret Stromatoveris as a member of early animal group Petalonamae that also included Arborea, Pambikalbae, rangeomorphs, dickinsoniomorphs and erniettomorphs.
- The first reliable occurrence of abundant penetrative trace fossils, providing trace fossil evidence for Precambrian bilaterians with complex behavioural patterns, is reported from the latest Ediacaran of western Mongolia by Oji et al. (2018).
- Trace fossils produced by Ediacaran animals which burrowed within sediment are described from the shallow-marine deposits of the Urusis Formation (Nama Group, Namibia) by Buatois et al. (2018), who name a new ichnotaxon Parapsammichnites pretzeliformis.
- New trace fossils from the Ediacaran Shibantan Member of the upper Dengying Formation (China), including burrows and possible trackways which were probably made by millimeter-sized animals with bilateral appendages, are described by Chen et al. (2018).
- An aggregation of members of the genus Parvancorina, providing evidence of two size-clusters and bimodal orientation in this taxon, is described from the Ediacara Conservation Park (Australia) by Coutts et al. (2018).
- New, three-dimensional specimens of Charniodiscus arboreus (Arborea arborea), allowing for a detailed reinterpretation of its functional morphology and taxonomy, are described from the Ediacara Member, Rawnsley Quartzite of South Australia by Laflamme, Gehling & Droser (2018).
- 3D reconstructions of Cloudina aggregates are presented by Mehra & Maloof (2018).
- A study on Namacalathus and Cloudina skeletons from the Ediacaran Omkyk Member of the Nama Group (Namibia) is published by Pruss et al. (2018), who interpret their findings as indicating that both organisms originally produced aragonitic skeletons, which later underwent diagenetic conversion to calcite.
- A study on the substrate growth dynamics, mode of biomineralization and possible affinities of Namapoikia rietoogensis is published by Wood & Penny (2018).
- A review of evidence for existence of swimming animals during the Neoproterozoic is published by Gold (2018).
- A study on the age of the Cambrian Chengjiang biota (China) is published by Yang et al. (2018).
- Description of coprolites from the Cambrian (Drumian) Rockslide Formation (Mackenzie Mountains, Canada) produced by an unknown predator, and a study on their implications for reconstructing the Cambrian food web, is published by Kimmig & Pratt (2018).
- A study on the nature and biological affinity of the Cambrian taxon Archaeooides is published by Yin et al. (2018), who interpret the fossils of Archaeooides as embryonic remains of animals.
- Zumberge et al. (2018) report a new fossil sterane biomarker, possessing a rare hydrocarbon skeleton that is uniquely found within extant demosponge taxa, from late Neoproterozoic–Cambrian sedimentary rocks and oils, and interpret this finding as indicating that demosponges, and hence multicellular animals, were prominent in some late Neoproterozoic marine environments at least extending back to the Cryogenian period.
- Diverse, abundant sponge fossils from the Ordovician–Silurian boundary interval are reported from seven localities in South China by Botting et al. (2018), who produce a model for the distribution and preservation of the sponge fauna.
- A study on the phylogenetic relationships of extant and fossil demosponges is published by Schuster et al. (2018).
- An assemblage of animal fossils, including the oldest known pterobranchs, preserved in the form of small carbonaceous fossils is described from the Cambrian Buen Formation (Greenland) by Slater et al. (2018).
- Description of new morphological features of the Cambrian mobergellan Discinella micans is published by Skovsted & Topper (2018).
- A study on the interrelationships between the eldonioid Pararotadiscus guizhouensis and associated fossil taxa from the Kaili Biota is published by Zhao et al. (2018).
- A study on the slab with a dense aggregation of members of the species Banffia constricta recovered from the Cambrian Burgess Shale (Canada) and its implications for life habits of the animal is published by Chambers & Brandt (2018).
- A study on the morphology and phylogenetic affinities of Yuyuanozoon magnificissimi, based on new specimens, is published by Li et al. (2018).
- A study on the fossil record of early Paleozoic graptoloids and on the factors influencing rates of diversification within this group is published by Foote et al. (2018).
- A study on the impact of the long-period astronomical cycles (Milankovitch "grand cycles") associated with Earth's orbital eccentricity and obliquity on the variance in species turnover probability (extinction probability plus speciation probability) in Early Paleozoic graptoloids is published by Crampton et al. (2018).
- A redescription of the species Malongitubus kuangshanensis from the Cambrian Chengjiang Lagerstätte (China) is published by Hu et al. (2018), who interpret this taxon as a pterobranch.
- A study on the morphology of the palaeoscolecid worm Palaeoscolex from the Lower Ordovician Fezouata Lagerstätte (Morocco), using computed microtomography and providing new information on the internal anatomy of this animal, is published by Kouraiss et al. (2018).
- The first occurrence of the tommotiid species Paterimitra pyramidalis from the Xinji Formation (China) is reported by Pan et al. (2018).
- A study on the temporal distribution of lophotrochozoan skeletal species from the upper Ediacaran to the basal Miaolingian of the Siberian Platform, and on its implications for understanding the evolutionary dynamics of the Cambrian explosion, is published by Zhuravlev & Wood (2018).
- Eggs of ascaridoid nematodes found in crocodyliform coprolites are described from the Upper Cretaceous Bauru Group (Brazil) by Cardia et al. (2018).
- A study reinterpreting the putative Cambrian lobopodian Mureropodia apae as a partial isolated appendage of a member of the genus Caryosyntrips, published by Pates & Daley (2017) is criticized by Gámez Vintaned & Zhuravlev (2018); Pates, Daley & Ortega-Hernández (2018) defend their original conclusions.
- A study on the early evolution of stem and crown-arthropods as indicated by Ediacaran and Cambrian body and trace fossils is published by Daley et al. (2018).
- A study on the evolution of ecdysozoan vision, focusing on the evolution of arthropod multi-opsin vision, as indicated by molecular data and data from fossil record, is published by Fleming et al. (2018).
- A juvenile specimen of Lyrarapax unguispinus, providing new information on the frontal appendages and feeding mode in this taxon, is described from the Cambrian Chiungchussu Formation (China) by Liu et al. (2018).
- A study evaluating likely swimming efficiency and maneuverability of Anomalocaris canadensis is published by Sheppard, Rival & Caron (2018).
- Cambrian animal Pahvantia hastata from the Wheeler Shale (Utah, United States), originally classified as a possible arthropod, is reinterpreted as a suspension-feeding radiodont by Lerosey-Aubril & Pates (2018).
- The presence of metameric midgut diverticulae is reported for the first time in the stem-arthropod Fuxianhuia protensa by Ortega-Hernández et al. (2018), who interpret their finding as indicative of a predatory or scavenging ecology of fuxianhuiids.
- Liu et al. (2018) reinterpret putative remains of the nervous and cardiovascular systems in numerous articulated individuals of Fuxianhuia protensa as more likely to be microbial biofilms that developed following decomposition of the intestine, muscle and other connective tissues.
- A study on the post-embryonic development of Fuxianhuia protensa is published by Fu et al. (2018).
- Redescription of the fuxianhuiid Liangwangshania biloba is published by Chen et al. (2018).
- New specimens of the stem-arthropod species Kerygmachela kierkegaardi, providing new information on the anatomy of this species and on the ancestral condition of the panarthropod brain, are described from the Cambrian Stage 3 of the Buen Formation (Sirius Passet, Greenland) by Park et al. (2018).
- Fossils of spindle- or conotubular-shaped animals of uncertain phylogenetic placement are described from the Ordovician Martinsburg Formation (Pennsylvania, United States) by Meyer et al. (2018).
- Evidence of macrofauna living at depths of up to 8 metres below the seabed is reported from the Permian Fort Brown Formation (Karoo Basin, South Africa) by Cobain et al. (2018).
- A study on the morphology of the hyolithid Paramicrocornus zhenbaensis from the lower Cambrian Shuijingtuo Formation (China) is published by Zhang, Skovsted & Zhang (2018), who report that this species lacked helens, and also report the oldest known hyolith muscle scars preserved on the opercula of this species.
- A study on the feeding strategies and locomotion of Cambrian hyolithids, based on specimens preserved in coprolites from the Chengjiang biota and associated with a Tuzoia carcass from the Balang Fauna (China), is published by Sun et al. (2018).
- Digestive tract of a specimen of the hyolith species Circotheca johnstrupi from the Cambrian Læså Formation (Bornholm, Denmark) is described by Berg-Madsen, Valent & Ebbestad (2018).
- The oldest stromatoporoid–bryozoan reefs reported so far are described from the middle Ordovician Duwibong Formation (South Korea) by Hong et al. (2018).
- Small bioconstructions formed solely by microconchid tube worms, representing the stratigraphically oldest exclusively metazoan bioconstructions from the earliest Triassic (mid-Induan) strata in East Greenland, are reported by Zatoń et al. (2018).
- The oldest known evidence of trematode parasitism of bivalves in the form of igloo-shaped traces found on shells of the freshwater bivalve Sphaerium is reported from the Upper Cretaceous Judith River Formation (Montana, United States) by Rogers et al. (2018).
- A study on the predatory drill holes in Late Cretaceous and Paleogene molluscan and serpulid worm prey from Seymour Island (Antarctica) and their implications for inferring the effects of the Cretaceous–Paleogene extinction event on predator-prey dynamics at this site is published by Harper, Crame & Sogot (2018).
- A study on burrows from Lower–Middle Triassic successions in South China assigned to the ichnotaxon Rhizocorallium, and on their implications for inferring the course of biotic recovery following the Permian–Triassic extinction event, is published by Feng et al. (2018).
- A study evaluating how different species of fossil and extant free-living cupuladriid bryozoans responded to the environmental changes in the Southwest Caribbean over the last 6 million years is published by O'Dea et al. (2018).

=== New taxa ===
Name	Novelty	Status	Authors	Age	Type locality	Country	Notes	Images
Acanthodesia variegata	Sp. nov	Valid	Di Martino & Taylor	Holocene		Indonesia	A bryozoan belonging to the group Cheilostomata and the family Membraniporidae.	
Acoscinopleura albaruthenica	Sp. nov	Valid	Koromyslova, Martha & Pakhnevich	Late Cretaceous (late Campanian)		Belarus	A bryozoan belonging to the group Flustrina and the family Coscinopleuridae.	
Acoscinopleura crassa	Sp. nov	Valid	Koromyslova, Martha & Pakhnevich	Late Cretaceous (Maastrichtian)		Germany	A bryozoan belonging to the group Flustrina and the family Coscinopleuridae.	
Acoscinopleura dualis	Sp. nov	Valid	Koromyslova, Martha & Pakhnevich	Late Cretaceous (Maastrichtian)		Germany	A bryozoan belonging to the group Flustrina and the family Coscinopleuridae.	
Acoscinopleura occulta	Sp. nov	Valid	Koromyslova, Martha & Pakhnevich	Late Cretaceous (Maastrichtian)		Germany	A bryozoan belonging to the group Flustrina and the family Coscinopleuridae.	
'Aechmella' viskovae	Sp. nov	Valid	Koromyslova, Baraboshkin & Martha	Late Cretaceous		Kazakhstan	A bryozoan.	
Aechmellina	Gen. et comb. nov	Valid	Taylor, Martha & Gordon	Cretaceous (Cenomanian) to Paleocene (Danian).		Denmark; France; Germany; United Kingdom; United States	A bryozoan belonging to the group Flustrina and the family Onychocellidae. The type species is "Aechmella" falcifera Voigt (1949); genus also includes "Homalostega" anglica Brydone (1909), "Aechmella" bassleri Voigt (1924), "Homalostega" biconvexa Brydone (1909), "Cellepora" hippocrepis Goldfuss (1826), "Aechmella" indefessa Taylor & McKinney (2006), "Aechmella" latistoma Berthelsen (1962), "Aechmella" linearis Voigt (1924), "Aechmella" parvilabris Voigt (1924), "Aechmella" pindborgi Berthelsen (1962), "Semieschara" proteus Brydone (1912), "Monoporella" seriata Levinsen (1925), "Aechmella" stenostoma Voigt (1930), "Reptescharinella" transversa d'Orbigny (1852) and "Aechmella" ventricosa Voigt (1924).	
Alacaris	Gen. et sp. nov	Valid	Yang et al.	Cambrian Stage 3	Hongjingshao Formation	China	A stem-arthropod related to Chengjiangocaris. The type species is A. mirabilis.	
Allonnia nuda	Sp. nov	Valid	Cong et al.	Cambrian Stage 3	Chengjiang Lagerstätte	China	A chancelloriid.	
Allonnia tenuis	Sp. nov	Valid	Zhao, Li & Selden	Early Cambrian		China	A chancelloriid.	
Arnaopora	Gen. et sp. nov	Valid	Suárez Andrés & Wyse Jackson	Devonian	Moniello Formation	Spain	A bryozoan belonging to the group Fenestrata. Genus includes new species A. sotoi.	
Aspidostoma armatum	Sp. nov	Valid	Pérez, López-Gappa & Griffin	Early Miocene	Monte León Formation	Argentina	A cheilostome bryozoan belonging to the family Aspidostomatidae.	
Aspidostoma roveretoi	Sp. nov	Valid	Pérez, López-Gappa & Griffin	Late Miocene	Puerto Madryn Formation	Argentina	A cheilostome bryozoan belonging to the family Aspidostomatidae.	
Aspidostoma tehuelche	Sp. nov	Valid	Pérez, López-Gappa & Griffin	Early to middle Miocene	Chenque Formation	Argentina	A cheilostome bryozoan belonging to the family Aspidostomatidae.	
Austroscolex sinensis	Sp. nov	Valid	Liu et al.	Cambrian (Paibian)		China	A palaeoscolecid.	
Axilosoecia	Gen. et 2 sp. nov	Valid	Taylor & Brezina	Paleocene (Danian) to early Miocene	Roca Formation	Argentina; New Zealand	A bryozoan belonging to the group Tubuliporina and the family Oncousoeciidae. The type species is A. giselae; genus also includes A. mediorubiensis.	
Burocratina	Gen. et sp. nov		Wachtler & Ghidoni	Early-Middle Triassic		Italy	A polychaete. The type species is B. kraxentrougeri.	
Catenagraptus	Gen. et sp. nov	Valid	VandenBerg	Ordovician (late Floian)		Australia	A graptolite belonging to the group Sinograptina and the family Sigmagraptidae. The type species is C. communalis.	
Characodoma wesselinghi	Sp. nov	Valid	Di Martino & Taylor	Holocene		Indonesia	A bryozoan belonging to the group Cheilostomata and the family Cleidochasmatidae.	
Cheethamia aktolagayensis	Sp. nov	Valid	Koromyslova, Baraboshkin & Martha	Late Cretaceous		Kazakhstan	A bryozoan.	
Codositubulus	Gen. et sp. nov	Valid	Gámez Vintaned et al.	Cambrian		Spain	A tubicolous animal of uncertain phylogenetic placement. The type species is C. grioensis.	
Colospongia lenis	Sp. nov	Valid	Malysheva	Late Permian		Russia (Primorsky Krai)	A sponge.	
Cornulites gondwanensis	Sp. nov	Valid	Gutiérrez-Marco & Vinn	Ordovician (Hirnantian)		Morocco	A member of Cornulitida.	
Cupitheca convexa	Sp. nov	Valid	Sun et al.	Cambrian	Manto Formation	China	A member of Hyolitha.	
Cystomeson	Gen. et sp. nov	Valid	Ernst, Krainer & Lucas	Carboniferous (Mississippian)	Lake Valley Formation	United States (New Mexico)	A bryozoan belonging to the group Cystoporata. Genus includes new species C. sierraensis.	
Decoritheca? hageni	Sp. nov	Valid	Peel & Willman	Cambrian Series 2	Buen Formation	Greenland	A member of Hyolitha.	
Demirastrites campograptoides	Sp. nov	Valid	Štorch & Melchin	Silurian (Aeronian)		Czech Republic	A graptolite belonging to the family Monograptidae.	
Dictyocyathus aranosensis	Sp. nov	Valid	Perejón et al.	Early Cambrian		Namibia	A member of Archaeocyatha.	
Didymograptellus kremastus	Sp. nov	Valid	Vandenberg	Ordovician (Floian)		Australia; New Zealand; Norway; United States	A graptolite belonging to the group Dichograptina and the family Pterograptidae.	
Erismacoscinus ganigobisensis	Sp. nov	Valid	Perejón et al.	Early Cambrian		Namibia	A member of Archaeocyatha.	
'Escharoides' charbonnieri	Sp. nov	Valid	Di Martino, Martha & Taylor	Late Cretaceous (Maastrichtian)		Madagascar	A bryozoan.	
Fehiborypora	Gen. et comb. nov	Valid	Di Martino, Martha & Taylor	Late Cretaceous (Maastrichtian)		Madagascar	A bryozoan; a new genus for "Cribilina" labiatula Canu (1922).	
Gibbavasis	Gen. et sp. nov		Vaziri, Majidifard & Laflamme	Ediacaran	Kushk Series	Iran	A vase-shaped organism of uncertain phylogenetic placement, possibly a poriferan-grade animal. The type species is G. kushkii.	
Homoctenus katzerii	Sp. nov	Valid	Comniskey & Ghilardi	Devonian (late Pragian or late Emsian)	Ponta Grossa Formation	Brazil	A member of Tentaculitoidea belonging to the order Homoctenida and the family Homoctenidae.	
Kalaallitia	Gen. et sp. nov	Valid	Peel & Willman	Cambrian Series 2	Buen Formation	Greenland	A member of Hyolitha. Genus includes new species K. myliuserichseni.	
Kamilocella	Gen. et comb. nov	Valid	Taylor, Martha & Gordon	Late Cretaceous (Cenomanian) to Campanian).		Czech Republic; France; Germany	A bryozoan belonging to the group Flustrina and the family Onychocellidae. The type species is "Eschara" latilabris Reuss (1872); genus also includes "Eschara" acis d'Orbigny (1851), "Onychocella" barbata Martha, Niebuhr & Scholz (2017), "Eschara" cenomana d'Orbigny (1851) and "Eschara" labiata Počta (1892).	
Kenocharixa	Gen. et sp. et comb. nov	Valid	Dick, Sakamoto & Komatsu	Cretaceous to Eocene		Japan; New Zealand	A cheilostome bryozoan. Genus includes new species K. kashimaensis, as well as "Charixa goshouraensis Dick, Komatsu, Takashima & Ostrovsky (2013) and "Conopeum" stamenocelloides Gordon & Taylor (2015).	
Khmeria minima	Sp. nov	Valid	Wendt	Late Triassic (Carnian)		Italy	An ascidian belonging to the new order Khmeriamorpha.	
Khmeria stolonifera	Sp. nov	Valid	Wendt	Late Permian, possibly also Carboniferous		Cambodia; Thailand; Vietnam	An ascidian belonging to the new order Khmeriamorpha.	
Kimberella persii	Sp. nov		Vaziri, Majidifard & Laflamme	Ediacaran	Kushk Series	Iran	A stem-mollusc bilaterian.	
Kootenayscolex	Gen. et sp. nov	Valid	Nanglu & Caron	Cambrian	Burgess Shale	Canada (British Columbia)	A polychaete. Genus includes new species K. barbarensis.	
Laminacaris	Gen. et sp. nov	Valid	Guo et al.	Cambrian Stage 3		China; United States?	A member of Radiodonta. Genus includes new species L. chimera.	
Lenisambulatrix	Gen. et sp. nov	Valid	Ou & Mayer	Cambrian Stage 3	Heilinpu Formation	China	A lobopodian. The type species is L. humboldti.	
Lunulites marambionis	Sp. nov	Valid	Hara et al.	Eocene	La Meseta Formation	Antarctica (Seymour Island)	A bryozoan belonging to the group Cheilostomata and the family Lunulitidae.	
Marginaria prolixa	Sp. nov	Valid	Dick, Sakamoto & Komatsu	Late Cretaceous (Campanian)	Himenoura Group	Japan	A cheilostome bryozoan.	
Matteolaspongia	Gen. et sp. nov	Valid	Botting, Zhang & Muir	Ordovician (Hirnantian)	Wenchang Formation	China	A sponge, possibly a stem-rossellid. The type species is M. hemiglobosa.	
Melychocella biperforata	Sp. nov	Valid	Pérez, López-Gappa & Griffin	Early Miocene	Chenque Formation; Monte León Formation	Argentina	A cheilostome bryozoan belonging to the family Aspidostomatidae.	
Micrascidites gothicus	Sp. nov	Valid	Sagular, Yümün & Meriç	Quaternary		Turkey	A didemnid ascidian.	
Micropora nordenskjoeldi	Sp. nov	Valid	Hara et al.	Eocene	La Meseta Formation	Antarctica (Seymour Island)	A bryozoan belonging to the group Cheilostomata and the family Microporidae.	
Minitaspongia	Gen. et sp. nov	Valid	Carrera et al.	Carboniferous (Tournaisian)	Agua de Lucho Formation	Argentina	A hexactinellid sponge belonging to the family Dictyospongiidae. The type species is M. parvis.	
Monniotia minutula	Sp. nov	Valid	Sagular, Yümün & Meriç	Quaternary		Turkey	A didemnid ascidian.	
Nasaaraqia	Gen. et sp. nov	Valid	Peel & Willman	Cambrian Series 2	Buen Formation	Greenland	A member of Hyolitha. Genus includes new species N. hyptiotheciformis.	
Neotrematopora lyaoilensis	Sp. nov	Valid	Tolokonnikova & Ponomarenko	Devonian (Frasnian)	Lyaiol Formation	Russia	A bryozoan.	
Nevadotheca boerglumensis	Sp. nov	Valid	Peel & Willman	Cambrian Series 2	Buen Formation	Greenland	A member of Hyolitha.	
Nidelric gaoloufangensis	Sp. nov	Valid	Zhao, Li & Selden	Early Cambrian		China	An animal with single-element spines.	
Nogrobs moroccensis	Sp. nov	Valid	Schlögl et al.	Middle Jurassic (Bajocian)	Agoudim Formation	Morocco	A serpulid polychaete.	
Onuphionella corusca	Sp. nov	Valid	Muir et al.	Ordovician (Sandbian)	First Bani Group	Morocco	Agglutinated tubes produced by unknown animal. Published online in 2018; the final version of the article naming it was published in 2022.	
Otionellina antarctica	Sp. nov	Valid	Hara et al.	Eocene	La Meseta Formation	Antarctica (Seymour Island)	A bryozoan belonging to the group Cheilostomata and the family Otionellidae.	
Otionellina eocenica	Sp. nov	Valid	Hara et al.	Eocene	La Meseta Formation	Antarctica (Seymour Island)	A bryozoan belonging to the group Cheilostomata and the family Otionellidae.	
Pedunculotheca	Gen. et sp. nov	Valid	Sun, Zhao & Zhu in Sun et al.	Cambrian Stage 3	Yu'anshan Formation	China	A member of Hyolitha belonging to the group Orthothecida. Genus includes new species P. diania.	
'Plagioecia' antanihodiensis	Sp. nov	Valid	Di Martino, Martha & Taylor	Late Cretaceous (Maastrichtian)		Madagascar	A bryozoan.	
Platychelyna secunda	Sp. nov	Valid	López-Gappa, Pérez & Griffin	Early Miocene	Monte León Formation	Argentina	A bryozoan.	
Pleurocodonellina javanensis	Sp. nov	Valid	Di Martino & Taylor	Early Pleistocene	Pucangan Formation	Indonesia	A bryozoan belonging to the group Cheilostomata and the family Smittinidae.	
Protohertzina compressa	Sp. nov	Valid	Slater, Harvey & Butterfield	Cambrian (Terreneuvian)	Lontova Formation; Voosi Formation	Estonia	A member of the total group of Chaetognatha.	
Qinscolex	Gen. et sp. nov	Valid	Liu et al.	Cambrian (Fortunian)		China	A cycloneuralian tentatively assigned to total-group Scalidophora. Genus includes new species Q. spinosus.	
Ramskoeldia	Gen. et 2 sp. nov	Valid	Cong et al.	Cambrian	Maotianshan Shales	China	A member of Radiodonta related to Amplectobelua. Genus includes new species R. platyacantha and R. consimilis.	
Reptomultisparsa stratosa	Sp. nov	Valid	Viskova & Pakhnevich	Middle Jurassic (Callovian)		Russia	A bryozoan.	
Rhagasostoma aralense	Sp. nov	Valid	Koromyslova et al.	Late Cretaceous (Campanian)		Uzbekistan	A bryozoan belonging to the group Flustrina and the family Onychocellidae.	
Rhagasostoma brydonei	Sp. nov	Valid	Koromyslova et al.	Late Cretaceous (Turonian and Coniacian)		United Kingdom	A bryozoan belonging to the group Flustrina and the family Onychocellidae.	
Rhagasostoma operculatum	Sp. nov	Valid	Koromyslova et al.	Late Cretaceous (Campanian)		Turkmenistan	A bryozoan belonging to the group Flustrina and the family Onychocellidae.	
Schistodictyon webbyi	Sp. nov	Valid	Zhen	Late Silurian		Australia	A sponge belonging to the class Stromatoporoidea, order Clathrodictyida and the family Anostylostromatidae.	
Seqineqia	Gen. et sp. nov	Valid	Peel	Cambrian (Guzhangian)	Holm Dal Formation	Greenland	A sponge. The type species is S. bottingi.	
"Serpula" calannai	Sp. nov	Valid	Sanfilippo et al.	Permian		Italy.	A serpulid polychaete.	
"Serpula" prisca	Sp. nov	Valid	Sanfilippo et al.	Permian		Italy.	A serpulid polychaete.	
Shaanxiscolex	Gen. et sp. nov	Valid	Yang et al.	Cambrian Stage 4		China	A palaeoscolecid. The type species is S. xixiangensis.	
Shanscolex	Gen. et sp. nov	Valid	Liu et al.	Cambrian (Fortunian)		China	A cycloneuralian tentatively assigned to total-group Scalidophora. Genus includes new species S. decorus.	
Sisamatispongia	Gen. et sp. nov	Valid	Peel	Cambrian (Guzhangian)	Holm Dal Formation	Greenland	A sponge. The type species is S. erecta.	
Sonarina	Gen. et sp. nov	Valid	Taylor & Di Martino	Late Cretaceous (late Campanian or early Maastrichtian)	Kallankurichchi Formation	India	A cheilostome bryozoan belonging to the family Onychocellidae. Genus includes new species S. tamilensis.	
Stanleycaris	Gen. et sp. nov	Valid	Pates, Daley & Ortega-Hernández	Cambrian	Stephen Formation; Wheeler Formation	Canada (British Columbia); United States (Utah)	A member of Radiodonta belonging to the group Hurdiidae. The type species is S. hirpex. The original description of the taxon appeared in an online supplement to the article published by Caron et al. (2010), making in invalid until it was validated by Pates, Daley & Ortega-Hernández (2018).	
Styliolina langenii	Sp. nov	Valid	Comniskey & Ghilardi	Devonian (middle to late Emsian)	Ponta Grossa Formation	Brazil	A member of Tentaculitoidea belonging to the order Dacryoconarida and the family Styliolinidae.	
Sullulika	Gen. et sp. nov	Valid	Peel & Willman	Cambrian Series 2	Buen Formation	Greenland	A selkirkiid stem-priapulid. Genus includes new species S. broenlundi.	
Tallitaniqa	Gen. et sp. nov	Valid	Peel	Cambrian (Guzhangian)	Holm Dal Formation	Greenland	A sponge. The type species is T. petalliformis.	
Tarimspira artemi	Sp. nov	Valid	Peel	Cambrian Stage 4	Henson Gletscher Formation	Greenland	An animal of uncertain phylogenetic placement described on the basis of fossil sclerites, possibly representing a stage in paraconodont evolution prior to the development of a basal cavity.	
Tentaculites kozlowskii	Sp. nov	Valid	Comniskey & Ghilardi	Devonian (late Pragian or late Emsian)	Ponta Grossa Formation	Brazil	A member of Tentaculitoidea belonging to the order Tentaculitida and the family Tentaculitidae.	
Tentaculites paranaensis	Sp. nov	Valid	Comniskey & Ghilardi	Devonian (late Pragian or late Emsian)	Ponta Grossa Formation	Brazil	A member of Tentaculitoidea belonging to the order Tentaculitida and the family Tentaculitidae.	
Thanahita	Gen. et sp. nov		Siveter et al.	Silurian (Wenlock)	Herefordshire Lagerstätte	United Kingdom.	A relative of Hallucigenia. The type species is T. distos.	
Trapezovitus malinkyi	Sp. nov	Valid	Peel & Willman	Cambrian Series 2	Buen Formation	Greenland	A member of Hyolitha.	
Turbicellepora yasuharai	Sp. nov	Valid	Di Martino & Taylor	Holocene		Indonesia	A bryozoan belonging to the group Cheilostomata and the family Celleporidae.	
Uniconus ciguelii	Sp. nov	Valid	Comniskey & Ghilardi	Devonian (late Pragian or late Emsian)	Ponta Grossa Formation	Brazil	A member of Tentaculitoidea belonging to the order Tentaculitida and the family Uniconidae.	
Zardinisoma	Gen. et 5 sp. nov	Valid	Wendt	Permian (Wordian) to Triassic (Carnian)	San Cassiano Formation	Italy; Japan	An ascidian belonging to the new order Khmeriamorpha. The type species is Z. cassianum; genus also includes Z. japonicum, Z. pauciplacophorum, Z. pyriforme and Z. polyplacophorum.	
Zhijinites tumourifomis	Sp. nov	Valid	Pan, Feng & Chang	Cambrian (Terreneuvian)	Yanjiahe Formation	China	A small shelly fossil.	

== Foraminifera ==
=== Research ===
- A study on the effects of differential ocean acidification at the Cretaceous-Paleocene transition on the planktonic foraminiferal assemblages from the Farafra Oasis (Egypt) is published by Orabi et al. (2018).
- A wide variety of morphological abnormalities in planktic foraminiferal tests from the earliest Danian, mainly from Tunisian sections, is described by Arenillas, Arz & Gilabert (2018).
- A study on the impact of the climatic and environmental perturbation on the morphology of foraminifera living during the Paleocene–Eocene Thermal Maximum is published by Schmidt et al. (2018).
- Taxonomic compilation and partial revision of early Eocene deep-sea benthic Foraminifera is presented by Arreguín-Rodríguez et al. (2018).
- A study on the responses of two species of foraminifera (extant Truncorotalia crassaformis and extinct Globoconella puncticulata) to climate change during the late Pliocene to earliest Pleistocene intensification of Northern Hemisphere glaciation (3.6–2.4 million years ago) is published by Brombacher et al. (2018).

=== New taxa ===
Name	Novelty	Status	Authors	Age	Type locality	Country	Notes
Alabamina heyae	Sp. nov	Valid	Fox et al.	Oligocene		Germany	A member of Rotaliida belonging to the family Alabaminidae.
Alicantina	Gen. et comb. nov	Valid	Soldan, Petrizzo & Silva	Eocene	Dunghan Formation; Langley Formation; Lizard Springs Formation; Navet Formation; Richmond Formation; Shaheed Ghat Formation; Thebes Formation; Universidad Formation	Cuba; Egypt; Italy; Jamaica; Pakistan; Spain; Syria; Trinidad and Tobago; Tunisia; Atlantic Ocean; Indian Ocean (Kerguelen Plateau); Pacific Ocean (Caroline Abyssal Plain; Shatsky Rise)	A member of the family Globigerinidae. The type species is "Globigerina" lozanoi Colom (1954); genus also includes "Globigerina" prolata Bolli (1957).
Ammobaculites deflectus	Sp. nov	Valid	Hjalmarsdottir, Nakrem & Nagy	Late Jurassic - Early Cretaceous	Agardhfjellet Formation	Norway	
Ammobaculites knorringensis	Sp. nov	Valid	Hjalmarsdottir, Nakrem & Nagy	Late Jurassic - Early Cretaceous	Agardhfjellet Formation	Norway	
Ammobaculoides dhrumaensis	Sp. nov	Valid	Kaminski, Malik & Setoyama	Middle Jurassic (Bajocian)	Dhruma Formation	Saudi Arabia	A member of Lituolida belonging to the family Spiroplectamminidae.
Asterigerinella jonesi	Sp. nov	Valid	Rögl & Briguglio	Miocene (Burdigalian)	Quilon Formation	India	
Brizalina keralensis	Sp. nov	Valid	Rögl & Briguglio	Miocene (Burdigalian)	Quilon Formation	India	
Chiloguembelina adriatica	Sp. nov	Valid	Premec Fucek, Hernitz Kucenjak & Huber	Eocene and Oligocene	Cipero Formation	Cuba; Syria; Trinidad and Tobago; Adriatic Sea; Gulf of Mexico; Pacific Ocean (Ontong Java Plateau)	A member of Guembelitrioidea belonging to the family Chiloguembelinidae.
Chiloguembelina andreae	Sp. nov	Valid	Premec Fucek, Hernitz Kucenjak & Huber	Late Eocene and early Oligocene		France; Syria; United States (New Jersey)	A member of Guembelitrioidea belonging to the family Chiloguembelinidae.
Ciperoella	Gen. et comb. nov	Valid	Olsson & Hemleben in Olsson et al.	Late Eocene to early Miocene	Cipero Formation; Tingnaro Formation	Australia; Austria; Belgium; Colombia; Cuba; France; Italy; Malta; Romania; Spain; Tanzania; Trinidad and Tobago; United States (Mississippi); Venezuela; Atlantic Ocean; Pacific Ocean	A member of Globigerinoidea belonging to the family Globigerinidae. The type species is "Globigerina" ciperoensis Bolli (1954); genus also includes "Globigerina" anguliofficinalis Blow (1969), "Globigerina ciperoensis" angulisuturalis Bolli (1957) (raised to the rank of the species Ciperoella angulisuturalis) and "Globigerina" fariasi Bermúdez (1961).
Colominella piriniae	Sp. nov	Valid	Mancin & Kaminski	Pliocene		Italy	A member of Textulariida.
Cyclammina saidovae	Nom. nov	Valid	Hanagata	Neogene		Japan	A species of Cyclammina; a replacement name for Cyclammina pseudopusilla Hanagata (2003).
Dentoglobigerina eotripartita	Sp. nov	Valid	Pearson, Wade & Olsson in Wade et al.	Eocene and Oligocene	Navet Formation	Indonesia; Tanzania; Trinidad and Tobago; United States (Mississippi); Adriatic Sea	A member of Globigerinoidea belonging to the family Globigerinidae.
Douglassites	Gen. et sp. nov	Valid	Read & Nestell	Carboniferous (late Pennsylvanian)	Riepe Spring Limestone	United States (Nevada)	A member of Fusulinida belonging to the family Schubertellidae. Genus includes new species D. sprucensis.
Elazigina siderea	Sp. nov	Valid	Consorti & Rashidi	Late Cretaceous (Maastrichtian)	Tarbur Formation	Iran; Oman; Turkey	A member of the group Rotaliida belonging to the family Rotaliidae.
Globigerina archaeobulloides	Sp. nov	Valid	Hemleben & Olsson in Spezzaferri et al.	Oligocene	Shubuta Formation	United States (Alabama)	A species of Globigerina.
Globigerinella roeglina	Sp. nov	Valid	Spezzaferri & Coxall in Spezzaferri et al.	Oligocene, possibly Miocene		Romania; Gulf of Mexico; Indian Ocean	A member of Globigerinoidea belonging to the family Globigerinidae.
Globigerinoides joli	Sp. nov	Valid	Spezzaferri in Spezzaferri, Olsson & Hemleben	Miocene		Caribbean Sea; Gulf of Mexico; South Atlantic Ocean; Indian Ocean (Kerguelen Plateau)	A species of Globigerinoides.
Globigerinoides neoparawoodi	Sp. nov	Valid	Spezzaferri in Spezzaferri, Olsson & Hemleben	Miocene		North-western Pacific Ocean	A species of Globigerinoides.
Globoconella pseudospinosa	Sp. nov	Valid	Crundwell	Early Pliocene		Southwest Pacific Ocean	
Globorotaloides atlanticus	Sp. nov	Valid	Spezzaferri & Coxall	Oligocene and Miocene		Atlantic Ocean; Indian Ocean; Pacific Ocean	A member of Globigerinoidea belonging to the family Globigerinidae.
Globoturborotalita eolabiacrassata	Sp. nov	Valid	Spezzaferri & Coxall in Spezzaferri et al.	Eocene to Miocene		Belgium; France; Romania; Tanzania; United States (New Jersey); Atlantic Ocean; Indian Ocean (Kerguelen Plateau); Pacific Ocean (Nazca Plate)	A member of Globigerinoidea belonging to the family Globigerinidae.
Globoturborotalita paracancellata	Sp. nov	Valid	Olsson & Hemleben in Spezzaferri et al.	Eocene and Oligocene		Western Atlantic Ocean; Gulf Coast of the United States	A member of Globigerinoidea belonging to the family Globigerinidae.
Globoturborotalita pseudopraebulloides	Sp. nov	Valid	Olsson & Hemleben in Spezzaferri et al.	Oligocene and Miocene		Australia; Austria; Tanzania; Trinidad and Tobago; Gulf of Mexico; South Atlantic Ocean; Western equatorial Pacific Ocean	A member of Globigerinoidea belonging to the family Globigerinidae.
Haplophragmoides perlobatus	Sp. nov	Valid	Hjalmarsdottir, Nakrem & Nagy	Late Jurassic - Early Cretaceous	Agardhfjellet Formation	Norway	
Hemisphaerammina apta	Sp. nov	Valid	McNeil & Neville	Early Eocene		Beaufort Sea	A member of the order Astrorhizida and the suborder Hemisphaeramminineae.
Ichnusella senerae	Sp. nov	Valid	Rigaud, Schlagintweit & Bucur	Early Cretaceous (Barremian–early Aptian)		Austria; France; Italy; Romania; Turkey; Croatia? Serbia? Ukraine?	A member of the group Spirillinida belonging to the family Spirillinidae.
Labrospira lenticulata	Sp. nov	Valid	Hjalmarsdottir, Nakrem & Nagy	Late Jurassic - Early Cretaceous	Agardhfjellet Formation	Norway	
Lenticulina stewarti	Sp. nov	Valid	Fox et al.	Oligocene (Rupelian)		Germany	A member of the group Nodosarioidea belonging to the family Vaginulinidae.
Moulladella	Gen. et sp. nov	Valid	Bucur & Schlagintweit	Early Cretaceous (Valanginian-Barremian)		Austria; Bulgaria; France; Romania; Serbia; Spain	A member of Loftusiida belonging to the family Pfenderinidae. The type species is "Meyendorffina (Paracoskinolina)" jourdanensis Foury & Moullade (1966).
Neodubrovnikella	Gen. et sp. nov	Valid	Schlagintweit & Rashidi	Late Cretaceous (Maastrichtian)	Tarbur Formation	Iran	Genus includes new species N. maastrichtiana.
Neonavarella	Gen. et sp. nov	Valid	Giusberti, Kaminski & Mancin	Paleocene (Thanetian)	Scaglia Rossa Formation	Italy	A member of Lituolida belonging to the family Ammobaculinidae. The type species is N. sudalpina.
Neotrocholina theodori	Sp. nov	Valid	Rigaud, Schlagintweit & Bucur	Early Cretaceous (Barremian–early Aptian)		Austria; France; Iran; Poland; Romania; Turkey	A member of the group Spirillinida belonging to the family Spirillinidae.
Nonion cepa	Sp. nov	Valid	Fox et al.	Late Oligocene to early Miocene		Central North Sea basin Netherlands	A member of the group Rotaliida belonging to the family Nonionidae.
Nummulites fayumensis	Sp. nov	Valid	Al Menoufy & Boukhary	Eocene (Lutetian)		Egypt	A nummulite.
Nummulites tenuissimus	Sp. nov	Valid	Al Menoufy & Boukhary	Eocene (Lutetian)		Egypt	A nummulite.
Omphalocyclus macroporus ellipsoides	Subsp. nov	Valid	Al Nuaimy	Late Cretaceous (Maastrichtian)	Aqra Formation	Iraq	
Omphalocyclus macroporus maukabensis	Subsp. nov	Valid	Al Nuaimy	Late Cretaceous (Maastrichtian)	Aqra Formation	Iraq	
Palaeoelphidium	Gen. et comb. nov	Valid	Consorti, Schlagintweit & Rashidi	Late Cretaceous (Maastrichtian)		Iran; Iraq; Qatar	A member of the family Elphidiellidae; a new genus for "Elphidiella" multiscissurata Smout (1955).
Paralachlanella	Gen. et sp. nov	Valid	Rögl & Briguglio	Miocene (Burdigalian)	Quilon Formation	India	Genus includes new species P. pilleri.
Pseudomassilina quilonensis	Sp. nov	Valid	Rögl & Briguglio	Miocene (Burdigalian)	Quilon Formation	India	
Pseudopeneroplis	Gen. et sp. nov	Valid	Consorti in Consorti et al.	Late Cretaceous (late Cenomanian)		Peru	A member of the superfamily Soritoidea and the family Praerhapydioninidae. Genus includes new species P. oyonensis.
Quiltyella	Gen. et comb. nov	Valid	Coxall & Spezzaferri in Spezzaferri et al.	Oligocene and Miocene		Austria; Romania; East Pacific Ocean	A member of Globigerinoidea belonging to the family Globigerinidae. The type species is "Clavigerinella" nazcaensis Quilty (1976); genus also includes "Hastigerinella" clavacella Rögl (1969).
Ranikothalia daviesi	Sp. nov	Valid	Sirel & Deveciler	Early Eocene		Turkey	A member of the group Rotaliida belonging to the family Nummulitidae.
Reophax pyriloculus	Sp. nov	Valid	Hjalmarsdottir, Nakrem & Nagy	Late Jurassic - Early Cretaceous	Agardhfjellet Formation	Norway	
Schubertella luisorum	Sp. nov	Valid	Villa in Villa, Merino-Tomé & Martín Llaneza	Carboniferous (Moscovian)	La Nueva Limestone; Meruxalín Limestone; Sutu Limestone	Spain	A member of Fusulinida.
Streptochilus tasmanensis	Sp. nov	Valid	Smart & Thomas	Oligocene		South Tasman Rise	A member of Bolivinoidea belonging to the family Bolivinidae.
Subbotina projecta	Sp. nov	Valid	Olsson, Pearson & Wade in Wade et al.	Late Eocene and Oligocene	Yazoo Formation	Tanzania; United States (Alabama; Mississippi); Atlantic Ocean; Pacific Ocean	A member of Globigerinoidea belonging to the family Globigerinidae.
Textularia pernana	Sp. nov	Valid	Hjalmarsdottir, Nakrem & Nagy	Late Jurassic - Early Cretaceous	Agardhfjellet Formation	Norway	A species of Textularia.
Trilobatus altospiralis	Sp. nov	Valid	Spezzaferri in Spezzaferri, Olsson & Hemleben	Miocene		South Pacific Ocean	A member of Globigerinoidea belonging to the family Globigerinidae.
Trochammina jakovlevae	Sp. nov	Valid	Glinskikh & Nikitenko	Middle Jurassic (late Bajocian-early Bathonian)	Churkino Formation	Russia	A member of the family Trochamminidae.
Uvigerina kingi	Sp. nov	Valid	Fox et al.	Middle Miocene		Netherlands; Southern and central North Sea	A member of the group Rotaliida belonging to the family Uvigerinidae.

== Other organisms ==
=== Research ===
- A study on putative stromatolites described from the 3,700-Myr-old rocks from the Isua supracrustal belt (Greenland) by Nutman et al. (2016) is published by Allwood et al. (2018), who interpret these putative stromatolites as more likely to be structures of non-biological origin.
- Carbon isotope analyses of 11 microbial fossils from the ~3,465-million-year-old Apex chert (Australia) are published by Schopf et al. (2018), who interpret two of the five studied species as primitive photosynthesizers, one as an Archaeal methane producer, and two as methane consumers.
- The oldest well-preserved microbial mats fabrics are described from the ≈3,472-million-year-old Middle Marker horizon, Barberton Greenstone Belt (South Africa) by Hickman-Lewis et al. (2018).
- Direct fossil evidence for life on land 3,220 million years ago in the form of terrestrial microbial mats is reported from the Moodies Group (South Africa) by Homann et al. (2018).
- Microfossils representing 18 morphotypes are reported from the c. 2.4 billion years old Turee Creek Group (Western Australia) by Barlow & Van Kranendonk (2018).
- Ten representative types of exceptionally well-preserved mat-related structures, interpreted as likely to be of biological origin and including putative microbial mats and discoidal microbial colonies, are reported from the 2.1-billion-year-old Francevillian series in Gabon by Aubineau et al. (2018).
- A study on the chemical, isotopic and molecular structural characteristics of the putative multicellular eukaryote fossils from carbonaceous compressions in the 1.63 billion years old Tuanshanzi Formation (China) is published by Qu et al. (2018).
- Intact porphyrins, the molecular fossils of chlorophylls, are described from 1,100-million-year-old marine black shales of the Taoudeni Basin (Mauritania) by Gueneli et al. (2018), who also study the nitrogen isotopic values of the fossil pigments, and interpret their findings as indicating that the oceans of that time were dominated by cyanobacteria, while larger planktonic algae were scarce.
- A study on the evolutionary history of bacteria is published by Louca et al. (2018), who interpret their findings as indicating that most bacterial lineages ever to have inhabited Earth are extinct.
- Bobrovskiy et al. (2018) report molecular fossils from organically preserved specimens of Beltanelliformis, and interpret the fossils as representing large spherical colonies of cyanobacteria.
- Discoid imprints sampled from the Precambrian terranes of central Dobruja (Romania) are described and assigned to the species Beltanelliformis brunsae by Saint Martin & Saint Martin (2018).
- A study on the age of the fossil red alga Bangiomorpha pubescens is published by Gibson et al. (2018).
- A reassessment of the anatomy and taxonomy of Orbisiana, based on a restudy of the rediscovered original type material of O. simplex, is published by Kolesnikov et al. (2018).
- A study on the positions of fossil specimens in the assemblages of Ediacaran fossils from Mistaken Point (Canada), as well as on their implications for inferring the interactions and associations between the Ediacaran organisms, is published by Mitchell & Butterfield (2018).
- A study on the height of Ediacaran organisms from Mistaken Point, evaluating the link between the increase of height and resource competition or greater offspring dispersal, is published by Mitchell & Kenchington (2018).
- Evidence of a radiation of the Ediacaran biota that witnessed the emergence and widespread implementation of novel, animal-style ecologies is presented by Tarhan et al. (2018), who argue that this transition was linked to the expansion of Ediacaran taxa into dynamic, shallow marine environments characterized by episodic disturbance and complex and diverse organically bound substrates, and propose that younger, second-wave Ediacaran communities resulting from said radiation were part of an ecological and evolutionary continuum with Phanerozoic ecosystems.
- A study on the size range, ontogeny and palaeoenvironment of Rugoconites is published by Hall, Droser & Gehling (2018).
- Elliptical body fossils are described from the Ediacaran–Fortunian deposits of central Brittany (France) by Néraudeau et al. (2018), representing the first body fossils described from these deposits.
- A study on the sandstone- and limestone-hosted occurrences of Palaeopascichnus linearis (including material from a new locality in Arctic Siberia), indicative of a greater range of taxonomic and taphonomic variation, is published by Kolesnikov et al. (2018).
- A study on the organic-walled microfossils from the Cambrian strata in the stratotype section of the Precambrian–Cambrian boundary in the Burin Peninsula (Canada) is published by Palacios et al. (2018).
- Fossils interpreted as threads of filamentous cyanobacteria are described from the Cambrian (Guzhangian) Alum Shale Formation (Sweden) by Castellani et al. (2018).
- Enigmatic Devonian taxon Protonympha is interpreted as a possible post-Ediacaran vendobiont by Retallack (2018).
- Description of fossils of nonmarine diatoms belonging to the genus Actinocyclus from the Lower to Middle Miocene lacustrine deposits in Japan and a study on the possible causal links between the evolution of nonmarine planktonic diatoms and the climatic and environmental changes that occurred during the Miocene is published by Hayashi et al. (2018).
- A study on the cell-size frequency distributions across calcareous nanoplankton communities through the Paleocene–Eocene Thermal Maximum, on their population biomass and on the impact of climate change on their cellular characteristics is published by Gibbs et al. (2018).

=== New taxa ===
Name	Novelty	Status	Authors	Age	Type locality	Country	Notes	Images
Alievium mangalensiense	Sp. nov	Valid	Bragina & Bragin	Late Cretaceous		Cyprus	A radiolarian belonging to the family Pseudoaulophacidae.	
Angochitina plicata	Sp. nov	Valid	Noetinger, di Pasquo & Starck	Devonian		Argentina	A chitinozoan.	
Anhuithrix	Gen. et comb. nov		Pang et al.	Tonian	Liulaobei Formation	China	A member of Cyanobacteria; a new genus for "Omalophyma" magna Steiner (1994).	
Attenborites	Gen. et sp. nov	Valid	Droser et al.	Ediacaran	Rawnsley Quartzite	Australia	An organism of uncertain phylogenetic placement, described on the basis of a well-defined irregular oval to circular fossil. Genus includes new species A. janeae. Announced in 2018; the final version of the article naming it was published in 2020.	
Cyclotella cassandrae	Sp. nov	Valid	Paillès et al.	Pleistocene		Guatemala	A diatom.	
Cyclotella petenensis	Sp. nov	Valid	Paillès et al.	Pleistocene		Guatemala	A diatom.	
Doulia	Gen. et sp. nov	Valid	Lian et al.	Cambrian Stage 3	Hongjingshao Formation	China	A possible planktonic alga of uncertain phylogenetic placement. Genus includes new species D. rara.	
Eolaminaria simigladiola	Sp. nov	Valid	Lian et al.	Cambrian Stage 3	Hongjingshao Formation	China	A macroalga of uncertain phylogenetic placement.	
Epistacheoides bozorgniai	Sp. nov	Valid	Falahatgar, Vachard & Sarfi	Carboniferous (Viséan)		Iran	An alga of uncertain phylogenetic placement.	
Girvanella lianiformis	Sp. nov	Valid	Peel	Cambrian (Drumian)	Ekspedition Bræ Formation	Greenland	A member of Cyanobacteria belonging to the family Cyanophyceae.	
Girvanella pituutaq	Sp. nov	Valid	Peel	Cambrian (Drumian)	Ekspedition Bræ Formation	Greenland	A member of Cyanobacteria belonging to the family Cyanophyceae.	
Gorgonisphaeridium impexus	Sp. nov	Valid	Noetinger, di Pasquo & Starck	Devonian		Argentina	An acritarch.	
Hylaecullulus	Gen. et sp. nov	Valid	Kenchington, Dunn & Wilby	Ediacaran		United Kingdom	A rangeomorph. The type species is H. fordi.	
Leiosphaeridia gorda	Sp. nov	Valid	Loron & Moczydłowska	Tonian	Visingsö Group; Wynniatt Formation	Canada; Sweden	A unicellular microorganism of algal affinities.	
Lontohystrichosphaera	Gen. et sp. nov	Valid	Slater, Harvey & Butterfield	Cambrian (Terreneuvian)	Lontova Formation	Estonia	A large ornamented acritarch of unresolved biological affinity, probably an ontogenetically and metabolically active eukaryotic organism rather than a dormant protistan cyst. Genus includes new species L. grandis.	
Mallomonas aperturae	Sp. nov	Valid	Siver	Middle Eocene	Giraffe Pipe locality	Canada	A synurid, a species of Mallomonas.	
Mallomonas bakeri	Sp. nov	Valid	Siver	Middle Eocene	Giraffe Pipe locality	Canada	A synurid, a species of Mallomonas.	
Mallomonas skogstadii	Sp. nov	Valid	Siver	Middle Eocene	Giraffe Pipe locality	Canada	A synurid, a species of Mallomonas.	
Mispertonia	Gen. et sp. nov	Valid	McLean et al.	Carboniferous (Mississippian) to Late Permian or Early Triassic		India; United Kingdom	An organic-walled microfossil of uncertain phylogenetic placement. Genus includes new species M. desiccata.	
Obamus	Gen. et sp. nov	Valid	Dzaugis et al.	Ediacaran	Rawnsley Quartzite	Australia	A torus-shaped organism, similar in gross morphology to some poriferans and benthic cnidarians. Genus includes new species O. coronatus. Announced in 2018; the final version of the article naming it was published in 2020.	
Orpikania	Gen. et sp. nov	Valid	Peel	Cambrian (Drumian)	Ekspedition Bræ Formation	Greenland	A member of the family Epiphytaceae (a group of organisms of uncertain phylogenetic placement). Genus includes new species O. freucheni.	
Pakupaku	Gen. et sp. nov	Valid	Riedman, Porter & Calver	Tonian	Black River Dolomite	Australia	A vase-shaped microfossil. Genus includes new species P. kabin.	
Pierceites deccanensis	Sp. nov	Valid	Prasad et al.	Late Cretaceous (Maastrichtian)		India	A dinoflagellate belonging to the family Peridiniaceae.	
Pseudoalievium	Gen. et 2 sp. nov	Valid	Bragina & Bragin	Late Cretaceous		Cyprus	A radiolarian belonging to the family Pseudoaulophacidae. Genus includes new species P. parekklisiense and P. inflatum.	
Pseudoaulophacus decoratus	Sp. nov	Valid	Bragina & Bragin	Late Cretaceous		Cyprus	A radiolarian belonging to the family Pseudoaulophacidae.	
Retiranus	Gen. et sp. nov	Valid	Slater, Harvey & Butterfield	Cambrian (Terreneuvian)	Lontova Formation; Voosi Formation	Estonia; Lithuania	A sheet-like or funnel-shaped organism of unresolved biological affinity. Genus includes new species R. balticus.	
Rugophyca	Gen. et sp. nov	Valid	Lian et al.	Cambrian Stage 3	Hongjingshao Formation	China	A macroalga of uncertain phylogenetic placement. Genus includes new species R. longa.	
Saarinomorpha	Gen. et sp. nov	Valid	Kolosov & Sofroneeva	Vendian		Russia	A tubiform organic-walled segmented microfossil, resembling Saarina juliae but smaller by one–two orders of magnitude. Genus includes new species S. infundibularis.	
Singulariphyca	Gen. et sp. nov	Valid	Lian et al.	Cambrian Stage 3	Hongjingshao Formation	China	A macroalga of uncertain phylogenetic placement. Genus includes new species S. ramosa.	
Stellarossica	Gen. et comb. nov	Valid	Vorob'eva & Sergeev	Precambrian	Ura Formation	Russia	A large acanthomorph acritarch. Genus includes new species S. ampla.	
Synsphaeridium parahioense	Sp. nov	Valid	Yin et al.	Cambrian Series 3		India	An acritarch.	
Tristratothallus	Gen. et sp. nov	Valid	Edwards et al.	Silurian (Ludfordian)	Downton Castle Sandstone Formation	United Kingdom	A nematophyte belonging to the family Nematothallaceae. Genus includes new species T. ludfordensis.	
Vendotaenia pavimentpes	Sp. nov	Valid	Yang & Qin in Yang et al.	Ediacaran	Dengying Formation	China	An alga.	
Vendotaenia sixiense	Sp. nov	Valid	Yang & Qin in Yang et al.	Ediacaran	Dengying Formation	China	An alga.	

== History of life in general ==
Research related to paleontology that concerns multiple groups of the organisms listed above.

- A study on the history of life on Earth is published by McMahon & Parnell (2018), who argue that the subsurface "deep biosphere" outweighed the surface biosphere by about one order of magnitude for at least half of the history of life.
- A timescale of life on Earth, based on a reappraisal of the fossil material and new molecular clock analyses, is presented by Betts et al. (2018).
- A study on functional shifts in modern phototrophic microbial mats across redox gradients, and on its implications for inferring the metabolic transitions experienced during the Great Oxygenation Event, is published by Gutiérrez-Preciado et al. (2018).
- A study on living cyanobacteria, testing the hypothesis that planktonic single-celled cyanobacteria could drive the export of organic carbon from the surface to deep ocean in the Paleoproterozoic, is published by Kamennaya et al. (2018).
- A study on the abundance of bio-essential trace elements during the period in Earth's history known as the "Boring Billion" is published by Mukherjee et al. (2018), who interpret their findings as indicating that key biological innovations in eukaryote evolution (the appearance of first eukaryotes, the acquisition of certain cell organelles, the origin of multicellularity and the origin of sexual reproduction) probably occurred during the period of a scarcity of trace elements, followed by a broad-scale diversification of eukaryotes during the period of a relative abundance of trace elements.
- A study on the eukaryotic species richness during Tonian and Cryogenian is published by Riedman & Sadler (2018).
- A study on the Ediacaran ecosystem complexity is published by Darroch, Laflamme & Wagner (2018), who report evidence of the Ediacara biota forming complex-type communities throughout much of their stratigraphic range, and thus likely comprising species that competed for different resources and/or created niche for others.
- A study evaluating how temperature can govern oxygen supply to animals at oceanographic scales, as well as how temperature dynamically affects the absolute tolerance of partial pressure of oxygen in marine ectotherms, and re-examining bathymetric patterns within the Ediacaran fossil record in an ecophysiological context, is published by Boag et al. (2018).
- A study investigating possible water column redox controls on the distribution and growth of the oldest animal communities, based on data from the Ediacaran Nama Group (Namibia), is published by Wood et al. (2018).
- Evans et al. (2018) report the discovery of a new assemblage of exceptionally preserved Ediacaran fossils from the Ediacara Member (Australia), including fossil material of Andiva ivantsovi providing new information on its morphology, possibly indicative of a phylogenetic relationship with Dickinsonia and Yorgia.
- A study on the duration of the faunal transition from Ediacaran to Cambrian biota, as indicated by data from a composite section in Namibia, is published online by Linnemann et al. (2018).
- A study on the evolution of the diversity of animal body plans, based on data from extant and Cambrian animals, is published by Deline et al. (2018).
- A review of the evidence for shell crushing (durophagy), drilling and puncturing predation in the Cambrian (and possibly the Ediacaran) is published by Bicknell & Paterson (2018).
- A study on the timing and process of ocean oxygenation in the early Cambrian and its impact on the diversification of early Cambrian animals, based on data from the Cambrian Niutitang Formation (China), is published by Zhao et al. (2018).
- A study on the evolution of marine animal communities over the Phanerozoic, evaluating the ecological changes caused by major radiations and mass extinctions, is published by Muscente et al. (2018).
- A study evaluating whether rapid warming preferentially increased the extinction risk of tropical marine fossil taxa throughout the Phanerozoic is published online by Reddin, Kocsis & Kiessling (2018).
- A study on the impact of mass extinctions on the global biogeographical structure, as indicated by data on time-traceable bioregions for benthic marine species across the Phanerozoic, is published by Kocsis, Reddin & Kiessling (2018).
- A study on the nektic and eunektic diversity and occurrences throughout the Paleozoic is published by Whalen & Briggs (2018).
- A study analyzing the link between net latitudinal range shifts of marine invertebrates and seawater temperature over the (post-Cambrian) Phanerozoic Eon is published by Reddin, Kocsis & Kiessling (2018).
- A study on within-habitat, between-habitat, and overall diversity of benthic marine invertebrates (gastropods, bivalves, trilobites, brachiopods and echinoderms) from Phanerozoic geological formations is published online by Hofmann, Tietje & Aberhan (2018).
- A study evaluating the link between macroevolutionary success (evolving many species) and macroecological success (the occupation of an unusually high number of areas by a species or clade) in fossil echinoid, cephalopod, bivalve, gastropod, brachiopod and trilobite species is published by Wagner, Plotnick & Lyons (2018).
- A study comparing the extinction events which occurred at the end of the Ordovician and at the end of the Capitanian (middle Permian) is published by Isozaki & Servais (2018).
- Filamentous microorganisms associated with annelid tubeworms are described from the Ordovician to early Silurian Yaman Kasy volcanic-hosted massive sulfide deposit (Ural Mountains, Russia) by Georgieva et al. (2018).
- Vertebrate fossil fauna from the Tournaisian-age Ballagan Formation exposed on the beach at Burnmouth (Scotland) is described by Otoo et al. (2018).
- A study on the early tetrapod diversity and biogeography in the Carboniferous and early Permian, evaluating the impact of the Carboniferous rainforest collapse on early tetrapod communities, is published by Dunne et al. (2018).
- A study on the patterns of dispersal and vicariance of tetrapods across Pangaea during the Carboniferous and Permian is published by Brocklehurst et al. (2018).
- O'Connor et al. (2018) reconstruct the most likely karyotype of the diapsid common ancestor based on data from extant reptiles and birds, and argue that most features of a typical 'avian-like' karyotype were in place before the divergence of birds and turtles ≈255 million years ago.
- A study evaluating whether the fossil record supports the reality of the Permian Olson's Extinction, based on an analysis of the tetrapod species richness in the tetrapod-bearing formations of Texas preserving fossils from the time of the extinction, is published by Brocklehurst (2018).
- A study on the patterns of species richness, origination rates and extinction rates of the mid-Permian tetrapods from South Africa is published by Day et al. (2018).
- A study on the changes of distribution of terrestrial tetrapods from the Permian (Guadalupian) to the Middle Triassic and on the impact of the Permian–Triassic extinction event on the palaeobiogeography of terrestrial tetrapods is published by Bernardi, Petti & Benton (2018).
- A study on the causes of biotic extinction during the Guadalupian-Lopingian transition is published online by Huang et al. (2018).
- A study on the composition and biotic interactions in terrestrial paleocommunities from the Karoo Basin (South Africa) spanning the Permian-Triassic mass extinction is published online by Roopnarine et al. (2018), who propose a new hypothesis to explain the persistence of biotic assemblages and their reorganization or destruction.
- A study on the biogeographic patterns and severity of extinction of marine taxa during the Permian–Triassic extinction event, evaluating whether global warming and ocean oxygen loss can mechanistically account for the marine mass extinction, is published by Penn et al. (2018).
- A study on changes in the structure of phytoplankton communities in South China during the Permian-Triassic transition is published online by Lei et al. (2018).
- A study on the recovery of benthic invertebrates following the Permian–Triassic extinction event, based on analysis of changes in the species richness, functional richness, evenness, composition, and ecological complexity of benthic marine communities from the Lower Triassic Servino Formation (Italy), is published by Foster et al. (2018).
- Description of an Early Triassic marine fauna from the Ad Daffah conglomerate in eastern Oman, and on its implications for inferring the ecology and diversity during the early aftermath of the Permian–Triassic extinction event, is published online by Brosse et al. (2018).
- A study on microbial mounds from the Lower Triassic Feixianguan Formation (China), and their implications for inferring the course of biotic recovery after the Permian–Triassic extinction event, is published by Duan et al. (2018).
- A study on the timing and pattern of ecosystem succession during and after the Permian–Triassic extinction event for the duration of the entire Triassic, as indicated by the changing diversity among non-motile, motile and nektonic animals, is published by Song, Wignall & Dunhill (2018).
- Marine faunas characterized by unusually high levels of both benthic and nektonic taxonomic richness are described from two Early Triassic sections from South China by Dai et al. (2018).
- A study on the historical shifts in geographical ranges and climatic niches of terrestrial vertebrates (both endotherms and ectotherms) based on data from extant and fossil vertebrates is published by Rolland et al. (2018).
- A study on the stratigraphic distribution of the marine vertebrate fossils of the Xingyi Fauna from the Middle Triassic Falang Formation (China) is published by Lu et al. (2018), who interpret their findings as indicating that the Xingyi Fauna comprises two distinct vertebrate assemblages, resulting from a major faunal change, which was probably caused by a turnover of their ecological setting from nearshore to offshore.
- A study on the patterns of diversity change and extinction selectivity in marine ecosystems during the Triassic–Jurassic interval, especially in relation to the Triassic–Jurassic extinction event, is published by Dunhill et al. (2018).
- A study on the extinction selectivity of marine organisms through the Late Triassic and Early Jurassic, evaluating whether there are any substantial differences between the hyperthermal events during the Triassic–Jurassic extinction event and Toarcian turnover and the periods of normal background extinction, is published by Dunhill et al. (2018).
- A study on the impact of changes in ocean chemistry beginning in the Mesozoic on the nutritional quality of planktonic algal biomass compared to earlier phytoplankton is published by Giordano et al. (2018).
- A study on the morphological, ecological and behavioural traits linked to the evolution of tail weaponization in extant and fossil amniotes is published by Arbour & Zanno (2018).
- A study on the factors which led to the colonization of marine environments in the evolution of amniotes is published by Vermeij & Motani (2018).
- A review of marine reptile (plesiosaur, ichthyosaur and thalattosuchian) fossils from the Oxfordian sedimentary rocks in Great Britain (United Kingdom), focusing on the Corallian Group, is published by Foffa, Young & Brusatte (2018), who report evidence of a severe reduction in observed marine reptile diversity during the Oxfordian.
- A study evaluating how the structure of marine reptile ecosystems and their ecologies changed over the roughly 18-million-year history of the Jurassic Sub-Boreal Seaway of the United Kingdom, as indicated by data from fossil teeth, is published by Foffa et al. (2018).
- A diverse and ecologically informative faunal assemblage is described from the Lower Cretaceous Arundel Clay facies (Maryland, United States) by Frederickson, Lipka & Cifelli (2018).
- Description of an assemblage of Early Cretaceous (Barremian) coprolites from the Las Hoyas Konservat-Lagerstätte (Spain) and a study on their biological and environmental affinities is published by Barrios-de Pedro et al. (2018).
- A study on the taphonomic properties of the inclusions contained in the Las Hoyas coprolites, and their implications for inferring the patterns of digestive processes of the producers of these coprolites, is published by Barrios-de Pedro & Buscalioni (2018).
- Description of isocrinid crinoids belonging to the genus Isocrinus from the Cretaceous amber from Myanmar is published by Mao et al. (2018), who also report coral columnals and oysters from the amber from Myanmar, and evaluate the age of this amber.
- A study on the taxonomic composition of the early Late Cretaceous fauna from the Cliffs of Insanity microvertebrate locality (Mussentuchit Member, Cedar Mountain Formation; Utah, United States) is published by Avrahami et al. (2018).
- Fossil assemblage including plant and vertebrate remains is described from the Turonian Ferron Sandstone Member of the Mancos Shale Formation (Utah, United States) by Jud et al. (2018), who report turtle and crocodilian remains and an ornithopod sacrum, as well as a large silicified log assigned to the genus Paraphyllanthoxylon, representing the largest known pre-Campanian flowering plant reported so far and the earliest documented occurrence of an angiosperm tree more than 1.0 m in diameter.
- A study comparing the ecological similarity of Cretaceous cold seep assemblages preserved in the Pierre Shale surrounding the Black Hills and modern cold-seep assemblages is published online by Laird & Belanger (2018).
- A record of foraminifera, calcareous nannoplankton, trace fossils and elemental abundance data from within the Chicxulub crater, dated to approximately the first 200,000 years of the Paleocene, is presented by Lowery et al. (2018), who report evidence indicating that life reappeared in the basin just years after the Chicxulub impact and a high-productivity ecosystem was established within 30,000 years.
- Vertebrate pathogens found associated with fossil hematophagous arthropods in Dominican, Mexican, Baltic, Canadian and Burmese amber are reported by Poinar (2018).
- Grimaldi et al. (2018) report biological inclusions (fungi, plants, arachnids and insects) in amber from the Paleogene Chickaloon Formation of Alaska, representing the northernmost deposit of fossiliferous amber from the Cenozoic.
- A synthesis of studies on the evolution of the cold-water coastal North Pacific biota over the last 36 million years, its origins and its influences on other temperate regions, is presented by Vermeij et al. (2018).
- A review of Neogene–Quaternary terrestrial vertebrate sites from the Middle Kura Basin (eastern Georgia and western Azerbaijan) is published by Bukhsianidze & Koiava (2018).
- A study on the reptile and amphibian fossils from the early Pleistocene site of the Russel-Tiglia-Egypte pit near Tegelen (Netherlands) is published by Villa et al. (2018).
- A study on the structure of the animal community known from the Okote Member of the Koobi Fora Formation at East Turkana (Kenya) as indicated by tracks and skeletal assemblages, and on the interactions of Homo erectus with environment and associated faunas from this site, is published by Roach et al. (2018).
- A revision of Middle Pleistocene faunal record from archeological sites in Africa, and a study on its implications for inferring potential links between hominin subsistence behavior and the Early Stone Age/Middle Stone Age technological turnover, is published online by Smith et al. (2018).
- Evidence of bird and carnivore exploitation by Neanderthals (cut-marks in golden eagle, raven, wolf and lynx remains) is reported from the Axlor site (Spain) by Gómez-Olivencia et al. (2018).
- A study on the compositions of the faunal and stone artifact assemblages at Liang Bua (Flores, Indonesia), aiming to determine the last appearance dates of Stegodon, giant marabou stork, Old World vulture belonging to the genus Trigonoceps, and Komodo dragon at the Liang Bua site, and to determine what raw materials were preferred by hominins from this site ~50,000–13,000 years ago and whether these are preferences were similar to those seen in the stone artifact assemblages attributed to Homo floresiensis or to those attributed to modern humans, is published by Sutikna et al. (2018).
- A study on the fossil Sporormiella, pollen and microscopic particles of charcoal recovered from sediments of Lake Mares and Lake Olhos d'Agua (Brazil) which spanned the time of megafaunal extinction and human arrival in southeastern Brazil, and on their implications for inferring the timing of the decline of local megafauna and its ecological implications, is published by Raczka, Bush & De Oliveira (2018).
- A study evaluating whether the occurrence and decline of spores of Sporormiella in sediments is a good proxy for the occurrence and extinction of megaherbivores, as indicated by data from Cuddie Springs in south-eastern Australia, is published by Dodson & Field (2018).
- A study evaluating how mega-herbivore animal species controlled plant community composition and nutrient cycling, relative to other factors during and after the Late Quaternary extinction event in Great Britain and Ireland, is published by Jeffers et al. (2018).
- A study on the impact of the late Quaternary extinction of megafauna on the megafauna-deprived ecosystems is published by Galetti et al. (2018).
- A study on the possible impact of the end of the millennial-scale climate fluctuations characteristic of the ice age (and the beginning of the more stable climate regime of the Holocene approximately 11,700 years ago) on the Late Quaternary megafaunal extinctions is published online by Mann et al. (2018).
- A study on the past biodiversity, population dynamics, extinction processes, and the impact of subsistence practices on the vertebrate fauna of New Zealand, based on analysis of bone fragments from archaeological and paleontological sites covering the last 20,000 years of New Zealand's past, is published by Seersholm et al. (2018).
- A study on changes in plant pathogen communities (fungi and oomycetes) in response to changing climate during late Quaternary, as indicated by data from solidified deposits of rodent coprolites and nesting material from the central Atacama Desert spanning the last ca. 49,000 years, is published by Wood et al. (2018).
- A study on the parsimony and Bayesian-derived phylogenies of fossil tetrapods, evaluating which of them are in closer agreement with stratigraphic range data, is published by Sansom et al. (2018).
- A study aiming to infer the causes of differences between estimates of speciation and extinction rates based on molecular phylogenies and those based on fossil record is published by Silvestro et al. (2018), who provide simple mathematical formulae linking the diversification rates inferred from fossils and phylogenies.
- A review of extinction theory and the fossil record of terrestrial diversity crises, comparing past diversity crises of terrestrial vertebrate faunas with the ongoing Holocene extinction, is published by Padian (2018).
- A new metric, which can be used to quantify the term "living fossil" and determine which organisms can be reasonably referred to as such, is proposed by Bennett, Sutton & Turvey (2018).
- A novel non-invasive and label-free tomographic approach to reconstruct the three-dimensional architecture of microfossils based on stimulated Raman scattering is presented by Golreihan et al. (2018).
- Mürer et al. (2018) report on the results of the use of a combination of X-ray diffraction and computed tomography to gain insight into the microstructure of fossil bones of Eusthenopteron foordi and Discosauriscus austriacus.
- A study on melanosomes preserved in the integument and internal organs of extant and fossil frog specimens, evaluating their implications for inferring colours of extinct animals on the basis of melanosomes preserved in fossil specimens, is published by McNamara et al. (2018).
- A study on fossil vertebrate tissues and experimentally matured modern samples, aiming to the mechanism of soft tissue preservation and the environments that favor it, is published by Wiemann et al. (2018).
- A mechanistic model that simulates the history of life on the South American continent, driven by modeled climates of the past 800,000 years, is presented by Rangel et al. (2018).
- A study on temporal trends in biogeography and body size evolution of Australian vertebrates is published by Brennan & Keogh (2018), who interpret their findings as indicating that gradual Miocene cooling and aridification of Australia correlated with the restricted phenotypic diversification of multiple ecologically diverse vertebrate groups.
- A study evaluating how faithfully stratigraphic ranges of extant Adriatic molluscs are recorded in a series of cores drilled through alluvial, coastal and shallow-marine strata of the Po Plain (Italy) is published by Nawrot et al. (2018), who also evaluate the implications of their study for interpretations of the timing, duration and ecological selectivity of mass extinction events in general.
- A study on the evolution of morphological disparity (i.e. diversity of anatomical types), as indicated by data from 257 published character matrices of fossil taxa, is published by Wagner (2018).
- A study on the evolution of functional and ecological innovations in temperate marine multicellular organisms inhabiting North Pacific during and after the Late Eocene is published by Vermeij (2018).
- A method for dividing a paleontological dataset into bioregions is proposed by Brocklehurst & Fröbisch (2018), who apply the proposed method to a study of beta diversity of Paleozoic tetrapods.
- A study aiming to estimate the magnitude and potential significance of palaeontological data from specimens housed in museum collections but not described in published literature is published by Marshall et al. (2018).
- Sallan et al. (2018) traced the cradle of evolutionary origins and diversification of fish from the mid-Paleozoic era in nearshore environments.
- Gómez-Olivencia et al. (2018) studied Kebara 2 Neanderthal thorax, aiming to understand how this ancient human species moved and breathed, based on a 3-D virtual reconstruction.
- Smith et al. (2018) examined the teeth of Neanderthal children who lived 250,000 years ago in France, in order to comprehend their nursing duration, and the effect of lead exposure and severe winters on them.
- Wiemann et al. (2018) studied dinosaur's egg colour evolution, in order to unravel whether modern birds inherited egg colour from their non-avian dinosaur ancestors.

=== Trace fossils ===
- A study on the Devonian strata in the Zachełmie Quarry (Poland) preserving tracks of early tetrapods is published by Qvarnström et al. (2018), who reinterpret the tracks as produced in non-marine environment.
- First tetrapod tracks from the Upper Permian–Lower Triassic (Lopingian–Induan) eolian strata of the Paraná Basin, southern Brazil, assigned to the ichnotaxa Dicynodontipus isp. and Chelichnus bucklandi, are described by Francischini et al. (2018).
- A diverse footprint assemblage dominated by small mammal tracks is described from the Lower Cretaceous Patuxent Formation (Maryland, United States) by Stanford et al. (2018), who name a new mammal ichnotaxon Sederipes goddardensis.

== Other research ==
Other research related to paleontology, including research related to geology, palaeogeography, paleoceanography and paleoclimatology.

- A study testing the hypothesis that chemodenitrification, the rapid reduction of nitric oxide by ferrous iron, would have enhanced the flux of nitrous oxide from Proterozoic seas, leading to nitrous oxide becoming an important constituent of Earth's atmosphere during Proterozoic and possibly life's primary terminal electron acceptor during the transition from an anoxic to oxic surface Earth, is published by Stanton et al. (2018).
- A study on the iron mineralogy of the 1.1-billion-year-old Paleolake Nonesuch (Nonesuch Formation), and on its implications for inferring whether the waters of this lake were oxygenated, is published by Slotznick, Swanson-Hysell & Sperling (2018).
- A study on the Earth's atmosphere and the productivity of global biosphere 1.4 billion years ago, based on triple oxygen isotope measurements sedimentary sulfates from the Sibley basin (Ontario, Canada), is published by Crockford et al. (2018).
- A study on the isotopically enriched chromium in Mesoproterozoic-aged shales from the Shennongjia Group (China) dating back to 1.35 billion years ago is published by Canfield et al. (2018), who interpret their findings as document elevated atmospheric oxygen levels through most of Mesoproterozoic Era, likely sufficient for early crown group animal respiration, but attained over 400 million years before they evolved.
- A study on the rate of biotic oxygen production and the attendant large-scale biogeochemistry of the mid-Proterozoic Earth system is published online by Ozaki, Reinhard & Tajika (2018).
- A study on the paleomagnetism of the Precambrian Bunger Hills dykes of the Mawson Craton (East Antarctica), and on its tectonic implications, is published by Liu et al. (2018).
- A study on the causes of formation and on global extent of the Great Unconformity is published online by Keller et al. (2018), who interpret their findings as indicating that this unconformity may record rapid erosion during Neoproterozoic "Snowball Earth" glaciations, and that environmental and geochemical changes which led to the diversification of multicellular animals may be a direct consequence of Neoproterozoic glaciation.
- A study on the environments and food sources that sustained the Ediacaran biota is published by Pehr et al. (2018), who present the lipid biomarker and nitrogen and carbon isotopic data obtained from late Ediacaran (<560 million years old) strata from seven drill cores and three outcrops spanning Baltica.
- Gougeon et al. (2018) report evidence from the Lower Cambrian Chapel Island Formation (Canada) indicating that a mixed layer of sediment, of similar structure to that of modern marine sediments (which results from bioturbation by epifaunal and shallow infaunal organisms), was well established in shallow marine settings by the early Cambrian.
- A study on the effects of the rise of bioturbation on global elemental cycles during the Cambrian is published by van de Velde et al. (2018).
- A review of the history of the definition of the Great Ordovician Biodiversification Event, aiming to clarify its concept and duration, is published by Servais & Harper (2018).
- A study on the phytoplankton community structure and export production at the end of the Ordovician, as indicated by data from the Vinini Formation (Nevada, United States), and on their impact on the global carbon cycle and possible relation to the onset of the Late Ordovician glaciation, is published by Shen et al. (2018).
- Evidence of multiple mercury enrichments in the two-step late Frasnian crisis interval from paleogeographically distant successions in Morocco, Germany and northern Russia is presented by Racki et al. (2018), who interpret their findings as indicating that the Late Devonian extinction was caused by rapid climatic perturbations promoted in turn by volcanic cataclysm.
- A study on the sedimentary facies, oxygen isotopes and the generic conodont composition in two continuous Devonian (late Frasnian to the end-Famennian) outcrops in the Montagne Noire (Col des Tribes section, France, part of the Armorica microcontinent in the Devonian) and in the Buschteich section (Germany, part of the Saxo-Thuringian microplate in the Devonian), assessing the water depth, approximate position relative to the shore and paleotemperatures in the Late Devonian, and evaluating whether environmental changes affected both areas similarly and at the same pace in the Late Devonian, is published online by Girard et al. (2018).
- A study on the onset and paleoenvironmental transitions associated with the Hangenberg Crisis within the Cleveland Shale member of the Ohio Shale is published online by Martinez et al. (2018).
- A study on the age of a bentonite layer from Bed 36 in the Frasnian–Famennian succession at the abandoned Steinbruch Schmidt Quarry (Germany), aiming to determine the precise age of the Frasnian–Famennian boundary and the precise timing of the Late Devonian extinction, is published by Percival et al. (2018).
- A study on the environmental changes and faunal turnover in the Karoo Basin (South Africa) during the late Permian is published by Viglietti, Smith & Rubidge (2018).
- A study on carbonate microfacies and foraminifer abundances in three Upper Permian sections from isolated carbonate platforms of the Nanpanjiang Basin (China), indicative of a marine environmental instability up to 60,000 years preceding Permian–Triassic extinction event, is published online by Tian et al. (2018).
- A study on the halogen compositions of Siberian rocks emplaced before and after the eruption of the Siberian flood basalts during the Permian–Triassic extinction event, and on its implications for inferring the source and nature of volatiles in the Siberian large igneous province, is published by Broadley et al. (2018).
- Evidence of enhanced continental chemical weathering at the Permian–Triassic boundary is reported from bulk rock samples from the Meishan section in South China by Sun et al. (2018), who also evaluate the potential impact of this enhanced weathering on global climate changes when the end-Permian extinction occurred.
- A study on the U-Pb geochronology, biostratigraphy and chemostratigraphy of a highly expanded section at Penglaitan (Guangxi, China) is published online by Shen et al. (2018), who interpret their findings as indicative of a sudden end-Permian mass extinction that occurred at 251.939 ± 0.031 million years ago.
- A study on the age of the dinosaur-bearing Triassic Santa Maria Formation and Caturrita Formation (Brazil) is published by Langer, Ramezani & Da Rosa (2018).
- Paleomagnetic and geochronologic study on the Chinle Formation (Petrified Forest National Park, Arizona, United States) is published by Kent et al. (2018), who report evidence indicating that a 405,000-year orbital eccentricity cycle linked to gravitational interactions with Jupiter and Venus was already influencing Earth's climate in the Late Triassic.
- Evidence of sill intrusions which were likely cause of the Triassic–Jurassic extinction event is reported from the Amazonas and Solimões Basins (Brazil) by Heimdal et al. (2018).
- A study on the palaeoenvironmental conditions that existed during the time the Upper Cretaceous Winton Formation (Australia) was deposited is published by Fletcher, Moss & Salisbury (2018).
- A study on the age of the Namba Member of the Galula Formation (Tanzania), yielding fossils of Pakasuchus, Rukwasuchus, Rukwatitan and Shingopana, is published by Widlansky et al. (2018).
- A study on the geology, age and palaeoenvironment of the main fossil-bearing beds of the Cretaceous Griman Creek Formation (New South Wales, Australia) is published online by Bell et al. (2018).
- A study on the nature of the fluvial systems of Laramidia during the Late Cretaceous, as indicated by data from vertebrate and invertebrate fossils from the Kaiparowits Formation of southern Utah, and on the behavior of dinosaurs over these landscapes, is published online by Crystal et al. (2018).
- A study on the rainfall seasonality and freshwater discharge on the Indian subcontinent in the Late Cretaceous (Maastrichtian), based on data from specimens of the mollusc species Phygraea (Phygraea) vesicularis from the Kallankuruchchi Formation (India), is published by Ghosh et al. (2018).
- Evidence of increased crustal production at mid-ocean ridges at the Cretaceous-Paleogene boundary, indicative of magmatism triggered by Chicxulub impact, is presented by Byrnes & Karlstrom (2018).
- A study on the oxygen isotopic composition of fish debris from the Global Boundary Stratotype Section and Point for the Cretaceous/Paleogene boundary at El Kef (Tunisia), indicative of a greenhouse warming in the aftermath of the Chicxulub impact, is published by MacLeod et al. (2018).
- A study on the environmental changes during the global warming following the brief impact winter at the Cretaceous-Paleogene boundary, based on geochemical, micropaleontological and palynological data from Cretaceous-Paleogene boundary sections in Texas, Denmark and Spain, is published by Vellekoop et al. (2018).
- A study on the Paleocene intermediate- and deep-water neodymium-isotope records from the North and South Atlantic Ocean, and on their implications for inferring the impact of changes in overturning circulation caused by the opening of the Atlantic Ocean on climate changes culminating in the greenhouse conditions of the Eocene, is published by Batenburg et al. (2018).
- A study on the magnetofossil concentrations preserved within sediments corresponding to the Paleocene–Eocene Thermal Maximum, as well as on the implications of magnetofossil abundance and morphology signatures for tracing palaeo-environmental conditions during the Paleocene–Eocene Thermal Maximum, is published by Chang et al. (2018).
- A study on the impact of greenhouse gas forcing and orbital forcing on changes in the seasonal hydrological cycle during the Paleocene–Eocene Thermal Maximum (for regions where proxy data is available) is published by Kiehl et al. (2018).
- A continuous Eocene equatorial sea surface temperature record is presented by Cramwinckel et al. (2018), who also construct a 26-million-year multi-proxy, multi-site stack of Eocene tropical climate evolution.
- A study on the continental silicate weathering response to the inferred CO_{2} rise and warming during the Middle Eocene Climatic Optimum is published by van der Ploeg et al. (2018).
- Su et al. (2018) use radiometrically dated plant fossil assemblages to quantify when southeastern Tibet achieved its present elevation, and what kind of floras existed there at that time.
- Description of a plant megafossil assemblage from the Kailas Formation in western part of the southern Lhasa terrane, and a study on its implications for inferring the elevation history of the southern Tibetan Plateau, is published online by Ai et al. (2018).
- A study on the relationship between the Rovno and Baltic amber deposits, based on stable carbon and hydrogen isotope analyses, is published by Mänd et al. (2018), who interpret their findings as indicative of distinct origin of Rovno and Baltic amber deposits.
- A study aiming to establish an accurate and precise age model for the eruption of the Columbia River Basalt Group, and to use it to test the hypothesis that there is a temporal relationship between the eruption of the Columbia River Basalt Group and the mid-Miocene climate optimum, is published by Kasbohm & Schoene (2018).
- A study on the age of the Ashfall Fossil Beds fossil site (Nebraska, United States) is published by Smith et al. (2018).
- A study on the causes of changes of environmental conditions in the Paratethys Sea of Central Europe during the middle Miocene is published online by Simon et al. (2018).
- A study on plant fossils spanning 14–4 million years ago from sites in Europe, Asia and East Africa, aiming to test the hypothesis of a single cohesive biome in the Miocene that extended from Mongolia to East Africa and at its peak covered much of the Old World, is published by Denk et al. (2018), who interpret data from plant fossil record as disproving the existence of a cohesive savannah biome from eastern Asia to northeast Africa, formerly inferred from mammal fossil record.
- A study on changes in local climate and habitat conditions in central Spain in a period from 9.1 to 6.3 million years ago, and on the diet and ecology of large mammals from this area in this time period as indicated by tooth wear patterns, is published online by De Miguel, Azanza & Morales (2018).
- Faith (2018) evaluates the aridity index, a widely used technique for reconstructing local paleoclimate and water deficits from oxygen isotope composition of fossil mammal teeth, arguing that in some taxa altered drinking behavior (influencing oxygen isotope composition of teeth) might have been caused by dietary change rather than water deficits.
- A study evaluating when the island of Sulawesi (Indonesia) gained its modern shape and size, and determining the timings of diversification of the three largest endemic mammals on the island (the babirusa, the Celebes warty pig and the anoa) is published by Frantz et al. (2018).
- A study on the Pliocene fish fossils from the Kanapoi site (Kenya) and their implications for reconstructing lake and river environments in the Kanapoi Formation is published online by Stewart & Rufolo (2018).
- Evidence indicating that reduced nutrient upwelling in the Bering Sea and expansion of North Pacific Intermediate Water coincided with the Mid-Pleistocene Transition cooling is presented by Kender et al. (2018), who assess the potential links between cooling, sea ice expansion, closure of the Bering Strait, North Pacific Intermediate Water production, reduced high latitude CO_{2} and nutrient upwelling, and development of the Mid-Pleistocene Transition.
- Domínguez-Rodrigo & Baquedano (2018) evaluate the ability of successful machine learning methods to compare and distinguish various types of bone surface modifications (trampling marks, crocodile bite marks and cut marks made with stone tools) in archaeofaunal assemblages.
- Description of new mammal and fish remains from the Olduvai Gorge site (Tanzania), comparing the mammal assemblage from this site to the present mammal community of Serengeti, and a study on their implications for reconstructing the paleoecology of this site at ~1.7–1.4 million years ago, is published by Bibi et al. (2018).
- A study on the environment in the interior of the Arabian Peninsula in the Pleistocene, as indicated by data from stable carbon and oxygen isotope analysis of fossil mammal tooth enamel from the middle Pleistocene locality of Ti's al Ghadah (Saudi Arabia), is published by Roberts et al. (2018).
- A study on the environmental dynamics before and after the onset of the early Middle Stone Age in the Olorgesailie Basin (Kenya) is published by Potts et al. (2018).
- A study on the chronology of the Acheulean and early Middle Stone Age sedimentary deposits in the Olorgesailie Basin (Kenya) is published by Deino et al. (2018).
- A study on the proxy evidence for environmental changes during past 116,000 years in lake sediment cores from the Chew Bahir basin, south Ethiopia (close to the key hominin site of Omo Kibish), and on its implications for inferring the environmental context for dispersal of anatomically modern humans from northeastern Africa, is published by Viehberg et al. (2018).
- A study on the effects of the Toba supereruption in East Africa is published by Yost et al. (2018), who find no evidence of the eruption causing a volcanic winter in East Africa or a population bottleneck among African populations of anatomically modern humans.
- A study on the environmental conditions in the area of present-day Basque Country (Spain) across the Middle to Upper Paleolithic transition, based on stable isotope data from red deer and horse bones, is published by Jones et al. (2018).
- The first reconstructions of terrestrial temperature and hydrologic changes in the south-central margin of the Bering land bridge from the Last Glacial Maximum to the present are presented by Wooller et al. (2018).
- A study on the fossil-bound nitrogen isotope records from the Southern Ocean is published by Studer et al. (2018), who interpret their findings as indicative of an acceleration of nitrate supply to the Southern Ocean surface from underlying deep water during the Holocene, possibly contributing to the Holocene atmospheric CO_{2} rise.
- A study on the causes of replacement of mature rainforests by a forest–savannah mosaic in Western Central Africa between 3,000 y ago and 2,000 years ago, based on a continuous record of 10,500 years of vegetation and hydrological changes from Lake Barombi Mbo (Cameroon) inferred from changes in carbon and hydrogen isotope compositions of plant waxes, is published by Garcin et al. (2018), who interpret their findings as indicating that humans triggered the rainforest fragmentation 2,600 years ago.
- A study on the vegetational and climatic changes since the last glacial period, based on data from 594 sites worldwide, and aiming to estimate the extent of future ecosystem changes under alternative scenarios of global warming, is published by Nolan et al. (2018).
- A study on the changing ecology of woodland vegetation of southern mainland Greece during the late Pleistocene and the early-mid Holocene, and on the ecological context of the first introduction of crop domesticates in the southern Greek mainland, as indicated by data from carbonized fuel wood waste from the Franchthi Cave, is published by Asouti, Ntinou & Kabukcu (2018).
- A large impact crater found beneath Hiawatha Glacier (Greenland), most likely formed during the Pleistocene, is reported by Kjær et al. (2018).

=== Paleoceanography ===
- A study on the nitrogen isotope ratios, selenium abundances, and selenium isotope ratios from the ~2.66 billion years old Jeerinah Formation (Australia), providing evidence of transient surface ocean oxygenation ~260 million years before the Great Oxygenation Event, is published by Koehler et al. (2018).
- A study on the ocean chemistry at the start of the Mesoproterozoic as indicated by rare earth element, iron-speciation and inorganic carbon isotope data from the 1,600–1,550 million years old Yanliao Basin, North China Craton is published by Zhang et al. (2018), who report evidence of a progressive oxygenation event starting at ≈1,570 million years ago, immediately prior to the occurrence of complex multicellular eukaryotes in shelf areas of the Yanliao Basin.
- Evidence of euxinia occurring in the photic zone of the ocean in the Mesoproterozoic, based on measurements of mercury isotope compositions in late Mesoproterozoic (~1.1 billion years old) shales from the Atar Group and the El Mreiti Group (Tauodeni Basin, Mauritania), is presented by Zheng et al. (2018).
- A study on abundant pyrite concretions from the topmost Nantuo Formation (China), deposited during the terminal Cryogenian Marinoan glaciation, is published by Lang et al. (2018), who interpret these concretions as evidence of a transient but widespread presence of marine euxinia in the aftermath of the Marinoan glaciation.
- A study on wave ripples and tidal laminae in the Elatina Formation (Australia), interpreted as evidence of rapid sea level rise in the aftermath of the Marinoan glaciation, is published by Myrow, Lamb & Ewing (2018).
- A study on the global ocean redox conditions at a time when the Ediacaran biota began to decline, based on analysis of uranium isotopes in carbonates from the Dengying Formation (China), is published by Zhang et al. (2018), who interpret their findings as indicative of an episode of extensive oceanic anoxia at the end of the Ediacaran.
- New uranium isotope data from upper Ediacaran to lower Cambrian marine carbonate successions, indicative of short-lived episodes of widespread marine anoxia near the Ediacaran-Cambrian transition and during Cambrian Stage 2, is presented by Wei et al. (2018), who argue that the Cambrian explosion might have been triggered by marine redox fluctuations rather than progressive oxygenation.
- New δ^{15}N data from late Ediacaran to Cambrian strata from South China is presented by Wang et al. (2018), who interpret their findings as indicating that ocean redox dynamics were closely coupled with key evolutionary events during the Ediacaran–Cambrian transition.
- A study on the isotopic composition and surface temperatures of early Cambrian seas, based on stable oxygen isotope data from the small shelly fossils from the Comley limestones (United Kingdom), is published by Hearing et al. (2018).
- High-resolution geochemical, sedimentological and biodiversity data from the Cambrian Sirius Passet Lagerstätte (Greenland is presented by Hammarlund et al. (2018), who aim to assess the chemical conditions in the shelf sea inhabited by the Sirius Passet fauna.
- A study on the impact of the disruption of sediments caused by Fortunian bioturbation on the ocean chemistry, as indicated by data from the Chapel Island Formation (Canada), is published by Hantsoo et al. (2018).
- A study on the timing of the Sauk transgression in the Grand Canyon region is published by Karlstrom et al. (2018).
- A study on the oxygen isotope composition of seawater throughout the Phanerozoic is published by Ryb & Eiler (2018).
- Jin, Zhan & Wu (2018) present paleontological, sedimentological, and geochemical data to test a hypothesis that a cold surface current became established by the late Middle Ordovician in the equatorial peri-Gondwana oceans, similar to the eastern equatorial Pacific cold tongue today.
- Evidence from uranium isotopes from Upper Ordovician–lower Silurian marine limestones of Anticosti Island (Canada), indicative of an abrupt global-ocean anoxic event coincident with the Late Ordovician mass extinction, is presented by Bartlett et al. (2018).
- A study on the ocean redox conditions and climate change across a Late Ordovician to Early Silurian on the Yangtze Shelf Sea (China) and their implications for inferring the causes of the Late Ordovician mass extinction is published by Zou et al. (2018).
- Evidence of multiple episodes of oceanic anoxia in the Early Triassic, based on U-isotope data from carbonates of the uppermost Permian to lowermost Middle Triassic Zal section (Iran), is presented by Zhang et al. (2018).
- A study on changes in global bottom water oxygen contents over the Toarcian Oceanic Anoxic Event, based on thallium isotope records from two ocean basins, is published by Them et al. (2018), who report evidence of global marine deoxygenation of ocean water some 600,000 years before the classically defined Toarcian Oceanic Anoxic Event.
- A study on the palaeoenvironmental conditions of the seas at high latitudes (60°) of southern South America during the Early Cretaceous is published online by Gómez Dacal et al. (2018).
- A study evaluating the utility of oxygen-isotope compositions of fossilised foraminifera tests as proxies for surface- and deep-ocean paleotemperatures, and its implications for inferring Late Cretaceous and Paleogene deep-ocean and high-latitude surface-ocean temperatures, published by Bernard et al. (2017) is criticized by Evans et al. (2018).
- Evidence from sulfur-isotope data indicative of a large-scale ocean deoxygenation during the Paleocene–Eocene Thermal Maximum is presented by Yao, Paytan & Wortmann (2018).
- Nitrogen isotope data from deposits from the northeast margin of the Tethys Ocean, spanning the Paleocene–Eocene Thermal Maximum, is presented by Junium, Dickson & Uveges (2018), who interpret their findings as indicating that dramatic change in the nitrogen cycle occurred during the Paleocene–Eocene Thermal Maximum.
- A study aiming to evaluate the global extent of surface ocean acidification during the Paleocene–Eocene Thermal Maximum is published by Babila et al. (2018).
- A study on the tropical sea-surface temperatures in the Eocene is published by Evans et al. (2018).
- A 25-million-year-long alkenone-based record of surface temperature change in the Paleogene from the North Atlantic Ocean is presented by Liu et al. (2018).
- A study on the likely magnitude of the sea-level drawdown during the Messinian salinity crisis, based on the analysis of the late Neogene faunas of the Balearic Islands, is published by Mas et al. (2018).
- An extensive, buried sedimentary body deposited by the passage of a megaflood from the western to the eastern Mediterranean Sea in the Pliocene (Zanclean), at the end of the Messinian salinity crisis, is identified in the western Ionian Basin by Micallef et al. (2018).
- A study on the impact of major, abrupt environmental changes over the past 30,000 years on the Great Barrier Reef is published by Webster et al. (2018).
- Evidence of sea level drop relative to the modern level at the shelf edge of the Great Barrier Reef between 21,900 and 20,500 years ago, followed by period of sea level rise lasting around 4,000 years, is presented by Yokoyama et al. (2018).

=== Paleoclimatology ===
- A study on the geologic record of Milankovitch climate cycles, extending their analysis into the Proterozoic and aiming to reconstruct the history of solar system characteristics, is published by Meyers & Malinverno (2018).
- A study on the effect of different forms of primitive photosynthesis on Earth's early atmospheric chemistry and climate is published by Ozaki et al. (2018).
- A quantitative estimate of Paleoproterozoic atmospheric oxygen levels is presented by Bellefroid et al. (2018).
- A study on the timing of the onset of the Sturtian glaciation, based on new stratigraphic and geochronological data from the upper Tambien Group (Ethiopia), is published by Scott MacLennan et al. (2018).
- A study on changes in the atmospheric concentration of carbon dioxide throughout the Phanerozoic, as indicated by data from a product of chlorophyll – phytane from marine sediments and oils, is published by Witkowski et al. (2018).
- A revised model and a new high-resolution reconstruction of the oxygenation of the Paleozoic atmosphere is presented by Krause et al. (2018).
- A study on the Early Ordovician climate, as indicated by new high-resolution phosphate oxygen isotope record of conodont assemblages from the Lange Ranch section of central Texas, is published by Quinton et al. (2018), who interpret their findings as consistent with very warm temperatures during the Early Ordovician.
- A study on the climate changes during the period of the Late Devonian extinction (and possibly causing it), inferred from a high-resolution oxygen isotope record based on conodont apatite from the Frasnian–Famennian transition in South China, is published by Huang, Joachimski & Gong (2018).
- A study on the atmospheric oxygen levels through the Phanerozoic, evaluating whether Romer's gap and the concurrent gap in the fossil record of insects were caused by low oxygen levels, is published by Schachat et al. (2018).
- A study on the impact of sulfur and carbon outgassing from the Siberian Traps flood basalt magmatism on the climate changes at the end of the Permian is published by Black et al. (2018).
- A study on the atmospheric carbon dioxide concentration levels in the Early Cretaceous based on data from specimens of the fossil conifer species Pseudofrenelopsis papillosa is published by Jing & Bainian (2018).
- A study on the terrestrial climate in northern China at the Cretaceous-Paleogene boundary, indicating the occurrence of a warming caused by the onset of Deccan Traps volcanism and the occurrence of extinctions prior to the Chicxulub impact, is published by Zhang et al. (2018).
- A study on the sources of secondary CO_{2} inputs after the initial rapid onset of the Paleocene–Eocene Thermal Maximum, contributing to the prolongation of this event, is published online by Lyons et al. (2018).
- Estimates of mean annual terrestrial temperatures in the mid-latitudes during the early Paleogene are presented by Naafs et al. (2018).
- A study on the early stages of development of Asian inland aridity and its underlying mechanisms, based on data from red clay sequence from the Cenozoic Xorkol Basin (Altyn-Tagh, northeastern Tibetan Plateau), is published by Li et al. (2018), who interpret their findings as indicating that enhanced Eocene Asian inland aridity was mainly driven by global palaeoclimatic changes rather than being a direct response to the plateau uplift.
- New mid-latitude terrestrial climate proxy record for southeastern Australia from the middle Eocene to the middle Miocene, indicative of a widespread cooling in the Gippsland Basin beginning in the middle Eocene, is presented by Korasidis et al. (2018).
- A study on CO_{2} concentrations during the early Miocene, as indicated by stomatal characteristics of fossil leaves from a late early Miocene assemblage from Panama and a leaf gas-exchange model, is published by Londoño et al. (2018).
- A study on the climate in the areas of the Iberian Peninsula inhabited by hominins during the Early Pleistocene, as indicated by data from macroflora and pollen assemblages, is published online by Altolaguirre et al. (2018).
- A study on the hydrological changes in the Limpopo River catchment and in sea surface temperature in the southwestern Indian Ocean for the past 2.14 million years, and on their implications for inferring the palaeoclimatic changes in southeastern Africa in this time period and their possible impact on the evolution of early hominins, is published by Caley et al. (2018).
- A study evaluating whether changes of vegetation and diet of East African herbivorous mammals were linked to climatic fluctuations 1.7 million years ago, based on data from mammal teeth from the Olduvai Gorge site, as well as evaluating whether crocodile teeth from this site may be used as paleoclimatic indicators, is published by Ascari et al. (2018).
- Evidence for progressive aridification in East Africa since about 575,000 years before present, based on data from sediments from Lake Magadi (Kenya), is presented by Owen et al. (2018), who also evaluate the influence of the increasing Middle- to Late-Pleistocene aridification and environmental variability on the physical and cultural evolution of Homo sapiens in East Africa.
- A study on the climatic changes in the Lake Tana area in the last 150,000 years and their implications for early modern human dispersal out of Africa is published by Lamb et al. (2018).
- A high-resolution palaeoclimate reconstruction for the Eemian from northern Finland, based on pollen and plant macrofossil record, is presented by Salonen et al. (2018).
- A study on the extent and nature of millennial/centennial-scale climate instability during the Last Interglacial (129–116 thousand years ago), as indicated by data from joint pollen and ocean proxy analyses in a deep-sea core on the Portuguese Margin (Atlantic Ocean) and speleothem record from Antro del Corchia cave system (Italy), is published by Tzedakis et al. (2018).
- A study on the timing and duration of periods of climate deterioration in the interior of the Iberian Peninsula in the late Pleistocene, evaluating the impact of climate on the abandonment of inner Iberian territories by Neanderthals 42,000 years ago, is published by Wolf et al. (2018).
- A study on the climate changes in Europe during the Middle–Upper Paleolithic transition (based on speleothem records from the Ascunsă Cave and from the Tăușoare Cave, Romania), and on their implications for the replacement of Neanderthals by modern humans in Europe, is published by Fernández et al. (2018).
- A study on the timing of the latest Pleistocene glaciation in southeastern Alaska and its implication for inferring the route and timing of early human migration to the Americas is published by Lesnek et al. (2018).
- Quantitative estimates of climate in western North America over the past 50,000 years, based on data from plant community composition of more than 600 individual paleomiddens, are presented by Harbert & Nixon (2018).
- A study assessing the similarity of future projected climate states to the climate during the Early Eocene, the Mid-Pliocene, the Last Interglacial (129–116 ka), the Mid-Holocene (6 ka), preindustrial (c. 1850 CE), and the 20th century is published by Burke et al. (2018).
