= Alaska North Slope basin =

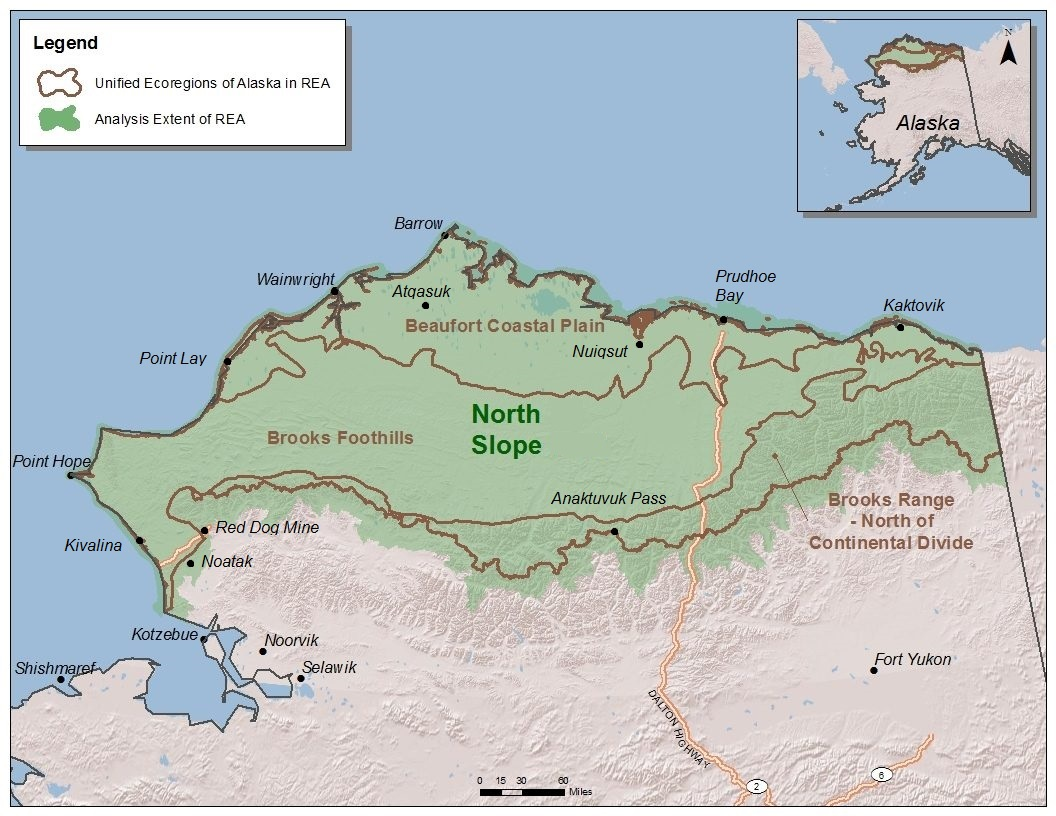
Alaskan North Slope, Foreland Basin

The Alaskan North Slope (ANS) is a foreland basin located on the northern edge of the Brooks Range. The Alaska North Slope is bounded on the north by the Beaufort Sea and runs from the Canadian border to the maritime boundary with Russia in the west. The western edge extends into the Chukchi Sea and Chukchi platform where the basin is at its widest. As the basin moves east it narrows towards the Canadian border. The basin is 1000 km long, 600 km at its widest, and covers a total area of 240,000 km^{2}.

== Basin formation ==
The ANS is broken into three provinces: the Brooks Range, the Northern Foothills, and the Coastal Plain. The foothills province has severely to gently deformed rock. The southern edge, closest to the Brooks Range, consists of folded and faulted Lower Cretaceous deposits. This region is home to the deepest section of the basin the Colville trough, with a maximum depth around 30,000 ft. The northern foothills province is made up of numerous elongated detachment folds in Mid to Late Cretaceous deposits. The coastal plain is a flat, low relief, area that is covered by Pleistocene deposits lacking structure until the Barrow Arch.

The Barrow Arch is a hinge line fault zone that marks a northern high in the ANS. The Barrow Arch runs east to west along the length of the basin and separates the ANS foreland basin from the Canadian Basin to the north. Sediments have a subtle dip of 3°-6° southward into the Colville trough.

The Colville Trough is the deepest part of the ANS Basin. It is on the southern edge of the foothills province just below the Brooks Range. The Colville Trough was formed in the Cretaceous by extreme subsidence that resulted from the Brooks Range Orogeny.

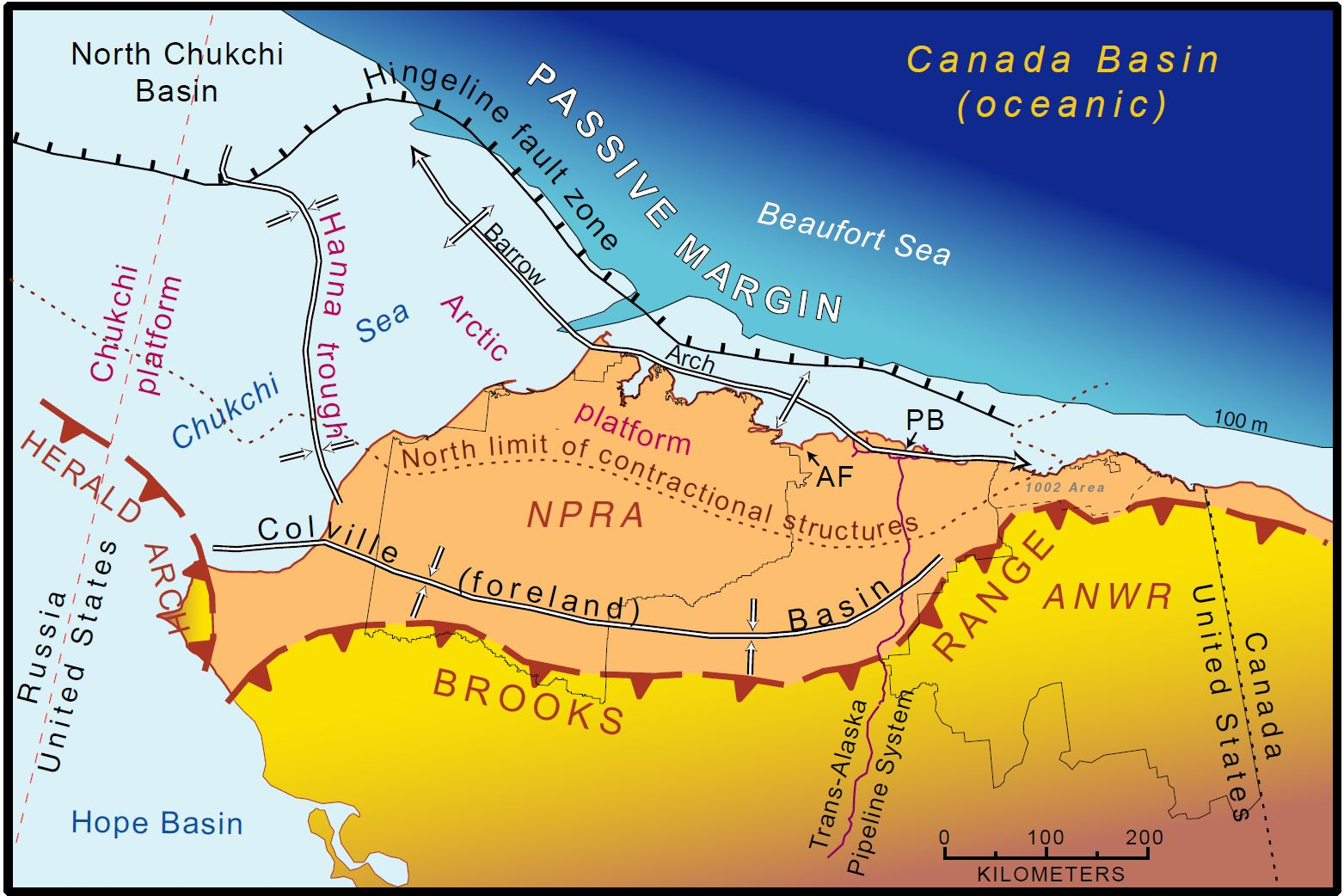
Alaskan North Slope Basin Boundary Map

== Tectonic setting ==
The ANS foreland basin was broken down into three depositional and tectonic sequences that define the deposits and structure of the basin.

From the Mississippian to Jurassic a carbonate ramp built out to the south on the passive margin of the Arctic Alaskan Plate. The Arctic Alaskan Plate was then rifted and rotated in the Early to Mid Cretaceous. This rifting created the Barrow Arch that separates the ANS from the Canadian Basin. As the plate continued to rotate it collided with the island arch chain, initiating the Brooks Range Orogeny. As the Brooks Range uplifted subsidence dropped the carbonate ramp and created a massive amount of accommodation space in the foothills region. Sedimentation couldn't keep up with the subsidence forming a shallow anoxic sea during the Late Cretaceous to Tertiary. These sediments, along with the Mississippian to Jurassic carbonate and shallow marine deposits, form the source and reservoir rock throughout the ANS foreland basin.

== Stratigraphy ==
The stratigraphy of the ANS is broken up into three major sequences the Ellesmerian, Beaufortian, and Brookian.

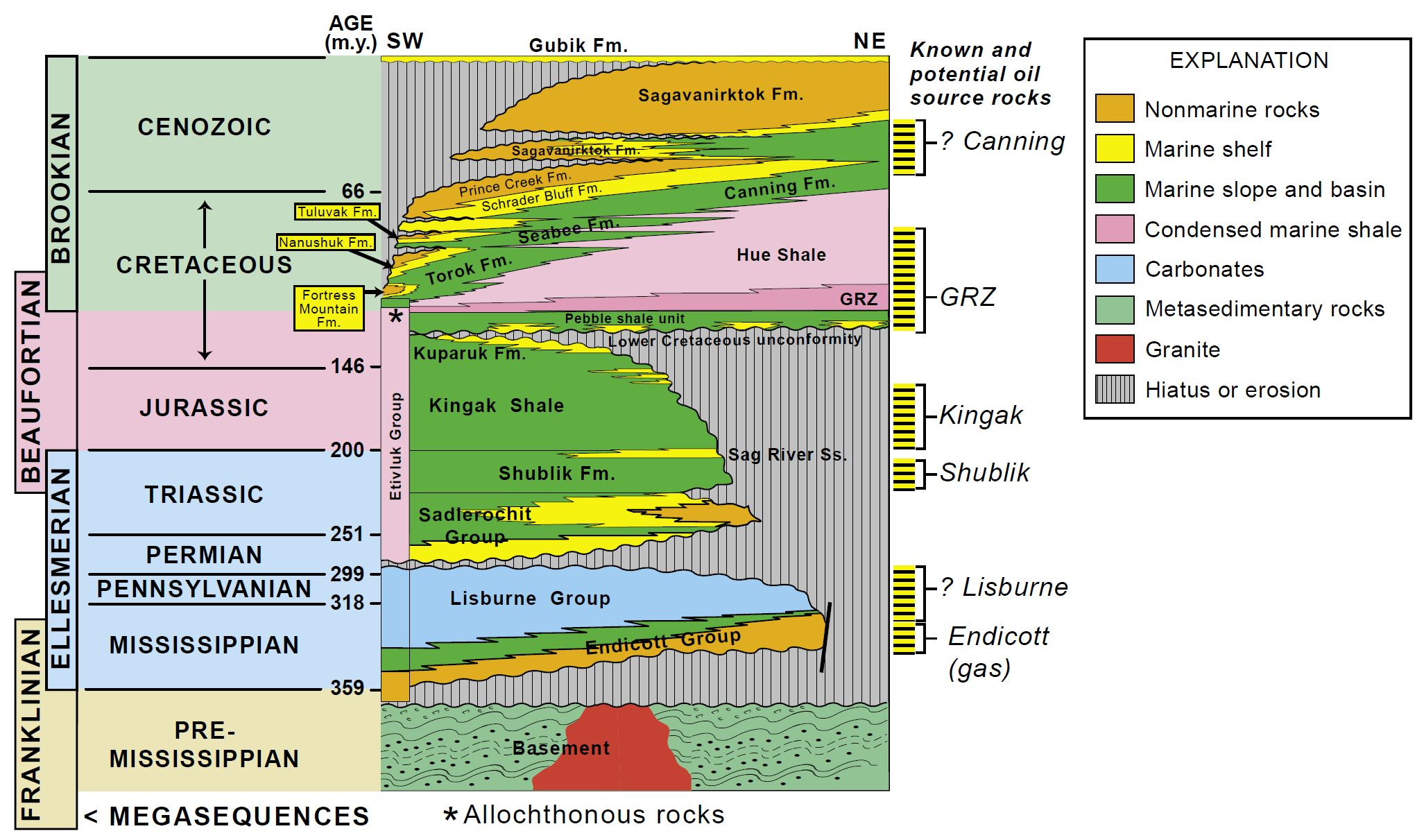
Stratigraphic Column of the Alaska North Slope

=== Ellesmerian Sequence ===
The Ellesmerian Sequence was deposited from the Mississippian to Triassic. Carbonate and shallow marine deposits accumulated on a southern facing passive margin. The Ellesmerian sequence thickens towards the south into the Colville Trough and west into the Hannah Trough, located in the Chukchi Sea. The Ellesmerian sequence hosts important reservoir and source rock units that are exploited throughout the region for hydrocarbons. The Lisburne Group is a carbonate dominated formation that has great reservoir potential as well as possible sourcing layers. The most important and actively producing formation is the Sadlerochit. It is a sandstone dominated reservoir that the Prudhoe Bay field gets the most hydrocarbon production from.

=== Beaufortian Sequence ===
The Beaufortian Sequence was deposited from the Jurassic to Lower Cretaceous. This sequence of deposition is dominated by shale and consists of syn-rift deposits supplied by local erosion. There are multiple unconformities present throughout this sequence. The most important is the Lower Cretaceous Unconformity (LCU). The LCU is an important migration pathway for regional hydrocarbons and is capped by Cretaceous mudstones that act as a stratigraphic trap. The most important source rock formations found in the Beaufortian sequence are the Kingak Shale and the Pebble Shale. The Pebble Shale Unit caps the LCU and is also a great hydrocarbon source unit.

=== Brookian Sequence ===
The Brookian Sequence was deposited from the Cretaceous to the Tertiary. This sequence is dominated by siliciclastic deposits sourced by both shallow marine and terrestrial deposits. This sequence is the thickest deposit of sediment and it coincides with the formation of the Brooks Range. Multiple reservoir units as well as hydrocarbon sources are present throughout. The Brookian sequence hosts multiple important formations for hydrocarbon exploration like the Hue Shale, Torok, Nanushuk, Seabee, and Schrader Bluff. The Torok Formation was deposited on the floor of the deep basin.

== Hydrocarbon production ==
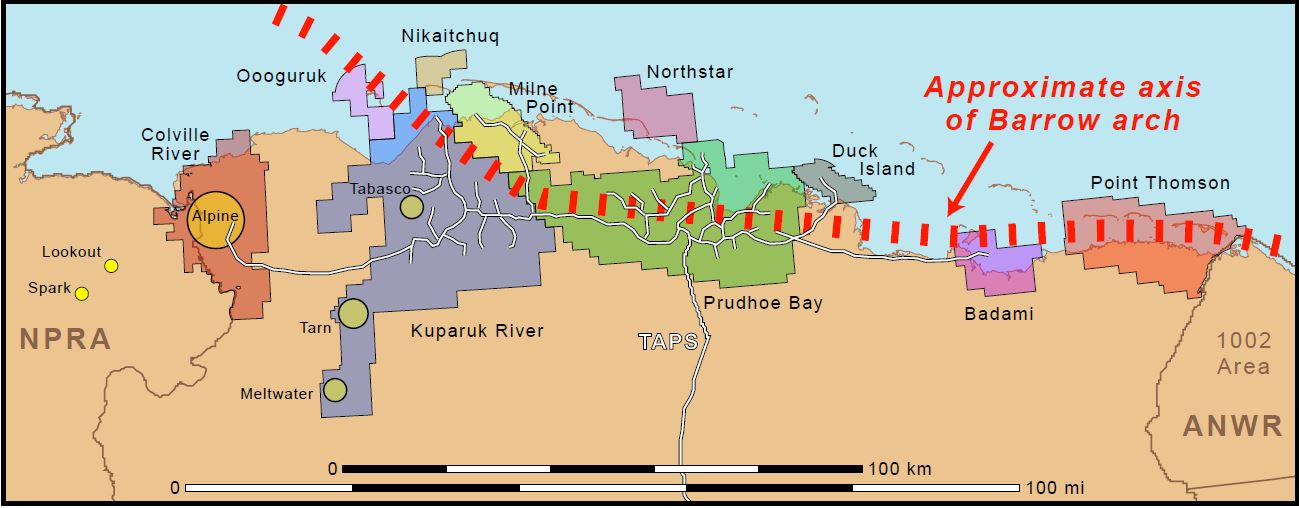
Map of Producing fields in Alaska North Slope

The Alaskan North Slope is one of the most prolific oil producing basins in North America. It dominates the Arctic in oil production with about 15 billion barrels produced, 12 billion barrels coming from the Prudhoe Bay field. Most of the production comes from the coastal area along the Barrow Arch where hydrocarbons are structurally and stratigraphically trapped migrating up the LCU. New fields are being found further from the structure associated with the Barrow Arch and they are more stratigraphically trapped by Cretaceous to Cenozoic deposits.

As of 2006, the top three oil-producing fields in the Alaskan North Slope were:

- Prudhoe Bay- 12 billion bbl
- Kuparuk River- 2 billion bbl
- Duck Island- 446 million bbl

As of 2006, the majority of the oil produced came from reserves in the Ellesmerian sequence. The central part of the location dominated production, specifically the Prudhoe Bay field, where there has been much structural trapping associated to the rifting and formation of the Barrow Arch. Oil pools continue to be discovered further from the arch and are predominantly stratigraphically trapped. Most of them were sourced by hydrocarbon reserves from the Beaufortian sequence.

After 2013, discoveries included pools into the Brookian sequence. In 2016, Caelus Energy drilled 2 wells it called "Tulimaniq" into a large Brookian submarine fan complex spanning more than 300 square miles.
