= Chignik Formation =

Geologic formation in Alaska, United States

- Stratigraphic range: Campanian to Maastrichtian
- Type: Formation
- Underlies: Tolstoi Formation
- Overlies: Pedmar Formation
- Thickness: Up to 600 meters

Lithology
- Primary: Conglomerate, sandstone, shale
- Other: Coal seams

Location
- Region: Alaska
- Country: United States
- Extent: Chignik and Herendeen Bays

Type section
- Named for: Chignik Bay
- Named by: Wallace Atwood

The Chignik Formation is a geologic formation in Alaska. It preserves fossils dating back to the late Cretaceous period. It unconformably overlies the Aptian-aged Pedmar Formation and is overlain unconformably by the late Paleocene-aged Tolstoi Formation.

The Chignik formation contains large amounts of coal, which was noted by Wallace Atwood when he formally described the formation in 1911. The depositional environment of the Chignik appears to have been a cyclical sequence of terrestrial tidal flats and offshore marine deposits, with alternating beds of shale and sandstone, with coarse conglomerates present as well. Some of the sandstone layers are oil-stained.

== Fossil Content ==
The fossil and rock records of the Chignik preserve both marine and terrestrial environments. The mollusk fossil record of the Chignik Formation indicates its age as a late Campanian to early Maastrichtian deposit. At least two bivalve species of the genus Inoceramus (I. schmidti and I. balticus), and the ammonite Canadoceras newberryanum, demonstrate the formation to be of this age. Fiorillo et al. (2019) estimated the Chignik formation to be roughly coeval with the dinosaur-bearing horizons of the Prince Creek and Cantwell Formations elsewhere in Alaska.

Plant fossils of the Chignik formation include several angiosperm and gymnosperm trees and shrubs, as well as the tentative cycadophyte Nilssonia serotina and the aquatic fern "Trapa" microphylla. (The actual genus Trapa includes water chestnuts, and is not a fern.)

Dinosaurs are known from the Chignik formation exclusively from fossil trackways, of which 93.6% are from hadrosaurids, including both juvenile and adult individuals. The remainder belong to ankylosaurs of uncertain taxonomic placement, avians (an ichnospecies of Magnoavipes similar to M. denaliensis, and Aquatilavipes swiboldae), and a single large theropod footprint attributed to a tyrannosaur similar to Nanuqsaurus.

== See also ==
- List of fossiliferous stratigraphic units in Alaska
- Paleontology in Alaska
