= List of fossiliferous stratigraphic units in Alaska =

This article contains a list of fossil-bearing stratigraphic units in the state of Alaska, U.S.

== Sites ==
| Group or Formation | Period | Notes |
|---|---|---|
| Adams Argillite Formation | Cambrian | |
| Alapah Formation | Carboniferous | |
| Baird Formation | Devonian, Silurian | |
| Bear Lake Formation | Neogene | |
| Beaver Bay Group/Stepovak Formation | Paleogene | |
| Beaver Bay Group/Tolstoi Formation | Paleogene | |
| Bowser Formation | Jurassic | |
| Buchia Ridge Formation | Cretaceous | |
| Cantwell Formation | Cretaceous | |
| Cape Deceit Formation | Pleistocene | |
| Cascaden Ridge Formation | Devonian | |
| Chapin Peak Formation | Triassic | |
| Cheeneetnuk Formation | Devonian | |
| Chickaloon Formation | Paleogene | |
| Chignik Formation | Cretaceous | |
| Chinitna Formation | Jurassic | |
| Chisana Formation | Cretaceous | |
| Chitistone Formation | Triassic | |
| Colville Group/Prince Creek Formation | Paleogene, Cretaceous | |
| Cornwallis Limestone | Triassic | |
| Coronados Volcanics Formation | Devonian | |
| Corwin Formation | Cretaceous | |
| Cynthia Falls Sandstone | Jurassic | |
| Dd Formation | Ordovician | |
| Descon Formation | Silurian | |
| Eagle Creek Formation | Permian | |
| Eek Mountain Formation | Cretaceous | |
| Eli Formation | Devonian | |
| Engineer Loess | Holocene | |
| Etivluk Group/Otuk Formation | Triassic | |
| Etivluk Group/Siksikpuk Formation | Permian, Carboniferous | |
| Eva Formation | Quaternary | |
| Fitz Creek Siltstone | Jurassic | |
| Fossil Creek Volcanics Formation | Ordovician | |
| Glenn Shale | Triassic | |
| Gold Hill Loess | Quaternary | |
| Goldstream Formation | Quaternary | |
| Grubstake Formation | Neogene | |
| Gubik Formation | | |
| Halleck Formation | Permian | |
| Hasen Creek Formation | Permian | |
| Heceta Limestone | Silurian | |
| Hillard Limestone | Cambrian | |
| Holitna Formation | Triassic, Silurian | |
| Hoodoo Formation | Cretaceous | |
| Hound Island Volcanics Formation | Triassic | |
| Ignek Formation | Cretaceous | |
| Imuruk Volcanics Formation | Neogene | |
| Jones Ridge Limestone | Cambrian | |
| Kamishak Formation | Jurassic, Triassic | |
| Kanayut Formation | Devonian | |
| Karheen Formation | Devonian, Silurian, Ordovician | |
| Kashevarof Formation | Silurian | |
| Kennel Creek Formation | Silurian | |
| Kennicott Formation | Cretaceous | |
| Kialagvik Formation | Jurassic | |
| Kingak Shale | Jurassic | |
| Kongakut Formation | Cretaceous | |
| Kugururok Formation | Devonian | |
| Kukpowruk Formation | Cretaceous | |
| Kuna Formation | Carboniferous | |
| Kupowruk Formation | Cretaceous | |
| Ladrones Formation | Carboniferous | |
| Limestone Mountain Formation | Devonian | |
| Lisburne Group/Alapah Limestone | Carboniferous | |
| Lisburne Group/Kogruk Formation | Carboniferous | |
| Lisburne Group/Upper Formation | Carboniferous | |
| Lone Mountain Formation | Ordovician | |
| Lower Cantwell Formation | Cretaceous | |
| Matanuska Formation | Cretaceous | |
| McCann Hill Formation | Devonian | |
| McCann Hill Chert Formation | Devonian | |
| McCarthy Formation | Triassic | |
| Mount Dall Formation | Permian | |
| Mount Oratia Formation | Cretaceous | |
| Naknek Formation | Jurassic | |
| Nanook Formation | Devonian, Ordovician | |
| Nanushuk Formation | Cretaceous | |
| Nanushuk Formation | Cretaceous | |
| Nanushuk Group/Chandler Formation | Cretaceous | |
| Nanushuk Group/Prince Creek Formation | Cretaceous | |
| Narrow Cape Formation | Neogene | |
| Nation River Formation | Devonian | |
| Nehenta Formation | Triassic | |
| Nuka Formation | Carboniferous | |
| Ogilvie Formation | Devonian | |
| Okipruak Formation | Cretaceous | |
| Okpikruak Formation | Cretaceous | |
| Orca Formation | Paleogene | |
| Otuk Formation | Triassic | |
| Peratrovich Formation | Carboniferous | |
| Phelan Creek Formation | Permian | |
| Port Clarence Limestone | Ordovician | |
| Port Refugio Formation | Devonian | |
| Poul Creek Formation | Paleogene | |
| Prince Creek Formation | Cretaceous | |
| Pybus Formation | Permian | |
| Ready Bullion Formation | Holocene | |
| Road River Formation | Silurian, Ordovician | |
| Sadlerochit Formation | Permian | |
| Sadlerochit Group/Ivishak Formation | Triassic | |
| Sagavanirktok Formation | Neogene | |
| Salmontrout Limestone | Devonian | |
| Schrader Bluff Formation | Cretaceous | |
| Shelikof Formation | Jurassic | |
| Shublik Formation | Triassic | |
| Siksikpuk Formation | Permian | |
| Skajit Formation | Devonian | |
| Slana Spur Formation | Permian | |
| Soda Creek Formation | Devonian | |
| South Bight II Formation | | |
| Split Creek Formation | Paleogene | |
| Staniukovich Formation | Cretaceous, Jurassic | |
| Stepovak Formation | Paleogene | |
| Tachilni Formation | Neogene | |
| Takhandit Formation | Permian | |
| Talkeetna Formation | Jurassic | |
| Telsitina Formation | Ordovician | |
| Telsitna Formation | Ordovician | |
| Tetelna Formation | Permian | |
| Tiglukpuk Formation | Jurassic | |
| Tolovana Formation | Devonian | |
| Tolstoi Formation | Paleogene | |
| Topsy Formation | Neogene | |
| Torok Formation | Cretaceous | |
| Tuxedni Group/Bowser Formation | Jurassic | |
| Tuxedni Group/Cynthia Falls Sandstone | Jurassic | |
| Tuxedni Group/Gaikema Formation | Jurassic | |
| Tuxedni Group/Red Glacier Formation | Jurassic | |
| Tyonek Formation | Neogene | |
| Ulungarat Formation | Devonian | |
| Unalaska Formation | Neogene, Paleogene | |
| Ungalikthluk Belt Formation | Cretaceous | |
| Upper Naknek Formation | Jurassic | |
| Wachsmuth Formation | Carboniferous | |
| Wadleigh Formation | Devonian | |
| Wadleigh Limestone | Devonian | |
| Whirlwind Creek Group/Upper Formation | Devonian | |
| Willoughby Formation | Silurian | |
| Willoughby Limestone | Silurian | |
| Yakataga Formation | Neogene | |

== See also ==
- Paleontology in Alaska
