= Talkeetna Formation =

Geologic formation in Alaska, United States

- Stratigraphic range: Sinemurian-Toarcian; ~199–175 Ma
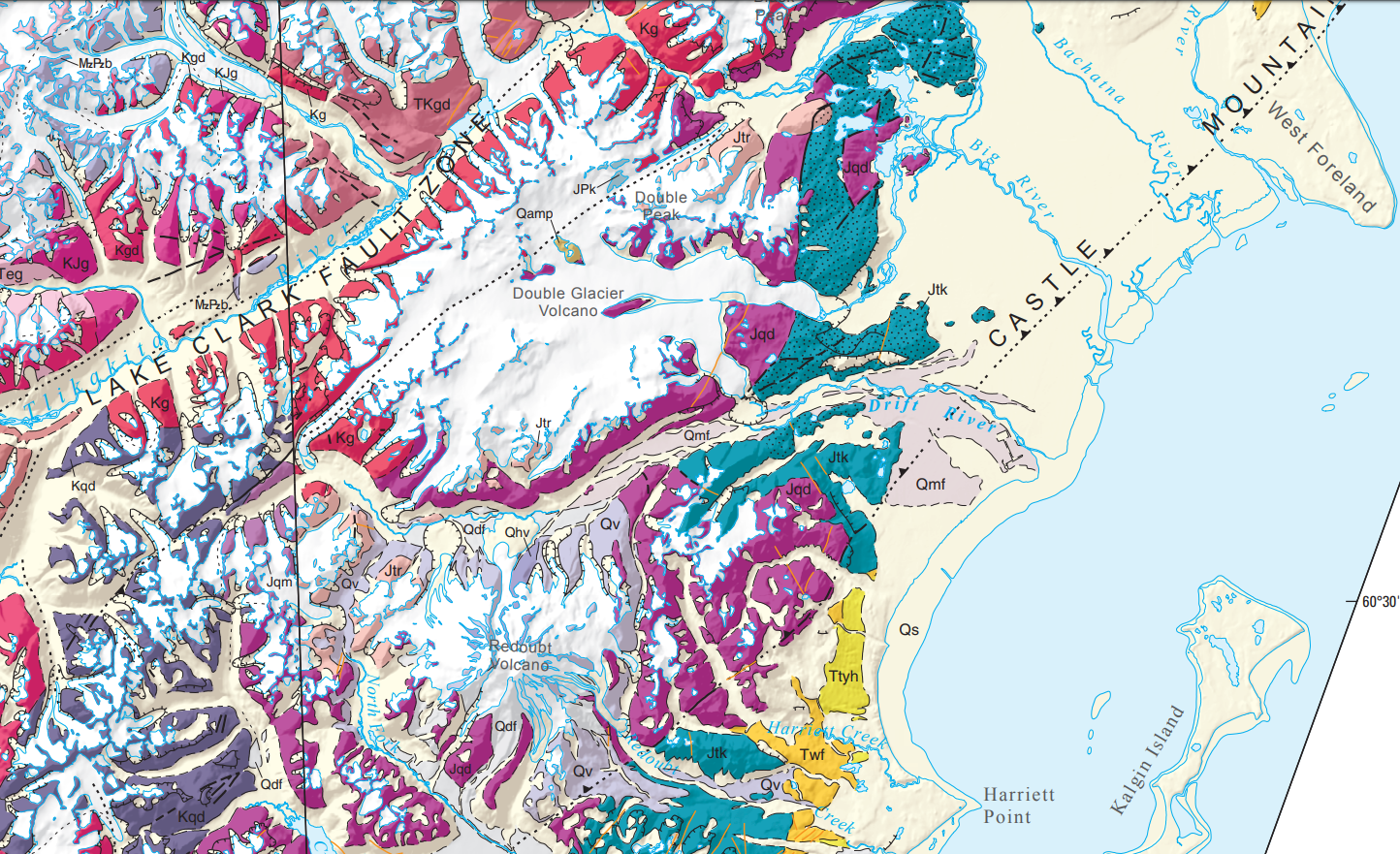
- Map of the region around Mount Redoubt; Jtk is the Talkeetna Formation (around the estuary of the Drift River)
- Type: Formation

Lithology
- Primary: Sandstone
- Other: Siltstone

Location
- Coordinates: 57.7°N 155.4°W
- Approximate paleocoordinates: 10.8°N 82.3°W
- Region: Alaska
- Country: United States

Type section
- Named for: Talkeetna Mountains

The Talkeetna Formation is a geologic formation in Alaska. It preserves fossils dating back to the Early Jurassic period.

== See also ==
- List of fossiliferous stratigraphic units in Alaska
- Paleontology in Alaska
- Kingak Shale
- Posidonia Shale
