= Early Cretaceous =

First epoch of the Cretaceous Period

Early/Lower Cretaceous
- 143.1 ± 0.6 – 100.5 ± 0.1 Ma
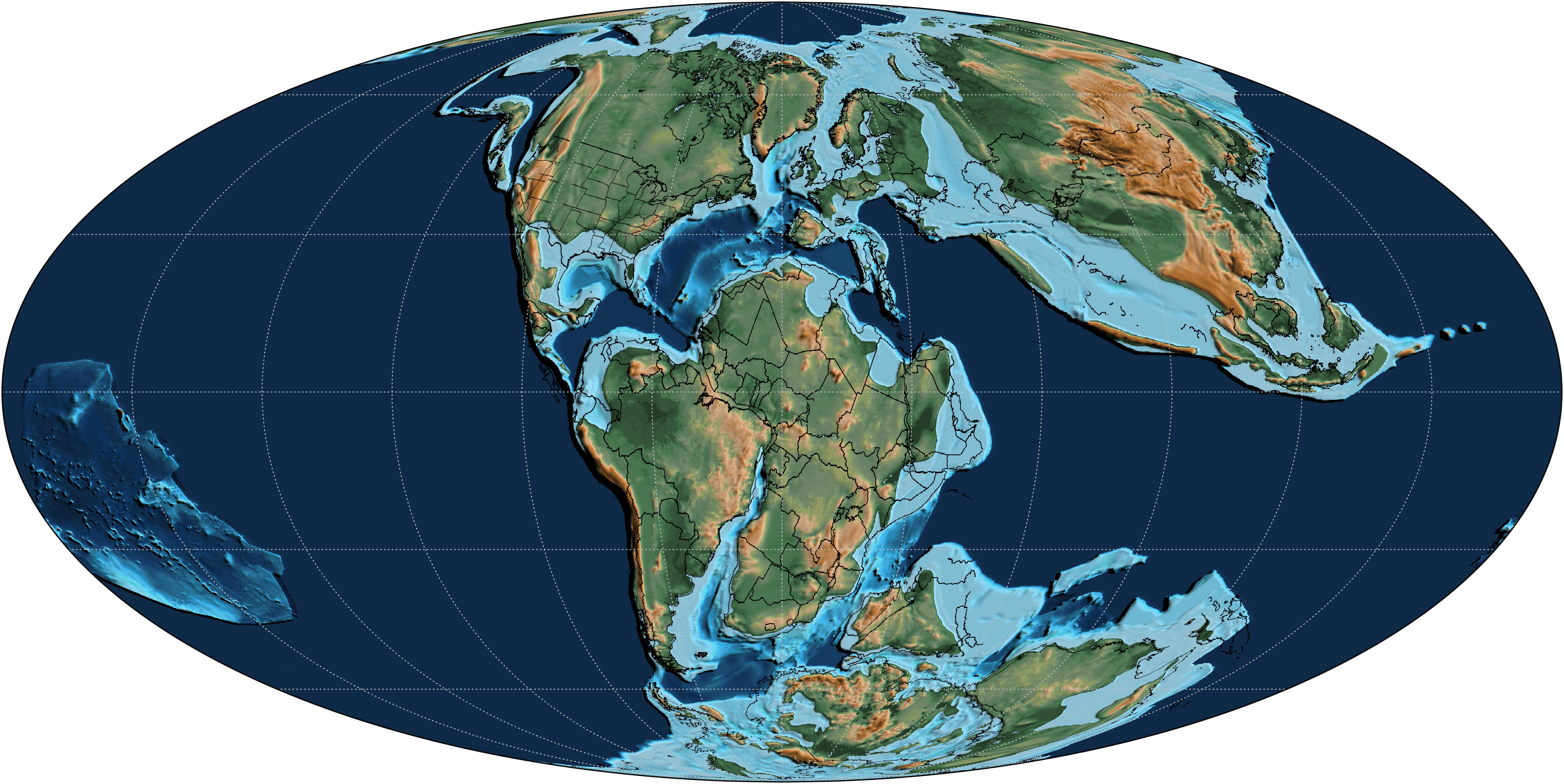
- A map of Earth as it appeared 120 million years ago during the Early Cretaceous Epoch, Aptian Age.

Chronology
← / K-Pg mass extinction
Subdivision of the Cretaceous according to the ICS, as of 2024. Vertical axis scale: Millions of years ago

Etymology
- Chronostratigraphic name: Lower Cretaceous
- Geochronological name: Early Cretaceous
- Name formality: Formal

Usage information
- Celestial body: Earth
- Regional usage: Global (ICS)
- Time scale(s) used: ICS Time Scale

Definition
- Chronological unit: Epoch
- Stratigraphic unit: Series
- Time span formality: Formal
- Lower boundary definition: Not formally defined
- Lower boundary definition candidates: Magnetic—base of Chron M18r; Base of Calpionellid zone B; FAD of Ammonite Berriasella jacobi
- Lower boundary GSSP candidate section(s): None
- Upper boundary definition: FAD of the Planktonic Foraminifer Rotalipora globotruncanoides
- Upper boundary GSSP: Mont Risoux, Hautes-Alpes, France; 44.3925°N 5.5119°E
- Upper GSSP ratified: 2002

The Early Cretaceous (geochronological name) or the Lower Cretaceous (chronostratigraphic name) is the earlier or lower of the two major divisions of the Cretaceous. It is usually considered to stretch from 143.1 Ma to 100.5 Ma.

== Geology ==
Proposals for the exact age of the Barremian–Aptian boundary ranged from 126 to 117 Ma until recently (as of 2019), but based on drillholes in Svalbard the defining early Aptian Oceanic Anoxic Event 1a (OAE1a) was dated to 123.1±0.3 Ma, limiting the possible range for the boundary to c. 122–121 Ma. There is a possible link between this anoxic event and a series of Early Cretaceous large igneous provinces (LIP).

The Ontong Java–Manihiki–Hikurangi large igneous province, emplaced in the South Pacific at c. 120 Ma, is by far the largest LIP in Earth's history. The Ontong Java Plateau today covers an area of 1,860,000 km^{2}. In the Indian Ocean another LIP began to form at c. 120 Ma, the Kerguelen Plateau–Broken Ridge, together covering 2,300,000 km^{2}. Another LIP on the Liaodong Peninsula, China, c. 131–117 Ma, lasted for 10 million years. It was the result of the subduction of the Kula and Pacific plates, which was probably caused by a superplume.

During the opening of the South Atlantic the Paraná–Etendeka LIP produced 1.5 million km^{3} of basalts and rhyolites, beginning 133 Ma and lasting for a million years.

The opening of the Central Atlantic continued as the Mid-Atlantic Ridge spread north to separate the Iberian Peninsula from the banks of Newfoundland and to connect to the Canada Basin in the Arctic Ocean. With the opening of the Labrador Sea, Greenland became a separate tectonic plate and Laurentia became North America. The Proto-Caribbean Sea continued to grow and the Paraná-Etendeka LIP began to break Africa into three pieces. The Falkland Plateau broke off from southern Africa at 132 Ma and Madagascar ceased to move independently c. 120 Ma. In the Panthalassic Ocean the Pacific Plate continued to grow; the Arctic Alaska-Chukotka terrane formed the Bering Strait. Continued rifting opened new basins in the Indian Ocean, separating India, Antarctica, and Australia.

By 110 Ma the Mid-Atlantic Ridge reached south into the Proto-Caribbean and South Atlantic, effectively separating South America from Africa, and continued rifting in the northern end completed the longitudinal extent of the Atlantic. In Panthalassa the Ontong-Java Mega-LIP resulted in the formation of new tectonic plates and in the Indian Ocean the Kerguelen LIP began to push India northward.

== Evolution ==
During this time many new types of dinosaur appeared or came into prominence, including ceratopsians, spinosaurids, carcharodontosaurids and coelurosaurs, while survivors from the Late Jurassic continued to persist.

Angiosperms (flowering plants) appeared for the first time during the Early Cretaceous; Archaefructaceae, one of the oldest fossil families (124.6 Ma) was found in the Yixian Formation, China.

This time also saw the evolution of the first members of the Neornithes (modern birds).

Sinodelphys, a 125 Ma-old boreosphenidan mammal found in the Yixian Formation, China, is one of the oldest mammal fossils found. The fossil location indicates early mammals began to diversify from Asia during the Early Cretaceous. Sinodelphys were more closely related to metatherians (marsupials) than eutherians (placentals) and had feet adapted for climbing trees. Steropodon is the oldest monotreme (egg-lying mammal) discovered. It lived in Gondwana (now Australia) at 105 Ma.

== Oil shale ==
Oil in the Prudhoe Bay Oil Field has been interpreted as being sourced from the Triassic Shublik Formation shale and carbonate, Lower Cretaceous highly radioactive zone shale, and Lower Jurassic Kingak Shale.

== See also ==
- Geological period
