= Kashevarov =

Kashevarov (Kashevarof,Kashevaroff), feminine: Kashevarova is a Russian patronymic surname derived from the nickname kashevar (a person who cooks kasha). It may sometimes be "hypercorrected" to Koshevarov. Notable persons with the surname include:

- Aleksandr Kashevarov (1809-1870) - Russian traveler, explorer of Russian America, the namesake of the Kashevarof Formation and Kashevarof Islands
- Andrew Kashevaroff, Russian orthodox priest in Alaska
- Olga Kashevarova (1905–1977) – Soviet operatic soprano
- Varvara Rudneva, Kashevarova in the first marriage (1841-1899), the first Russian woman - doctor of medicine
- Xenia Andreyevna Kashevaroff, birth name of Xenia Cage (1913–1995), American surrealist sculptor
