= Prince Creek Formation =

Geological formation

- Stratigraphic range: Middle Campanian-Selandian; ~77–60 Ma
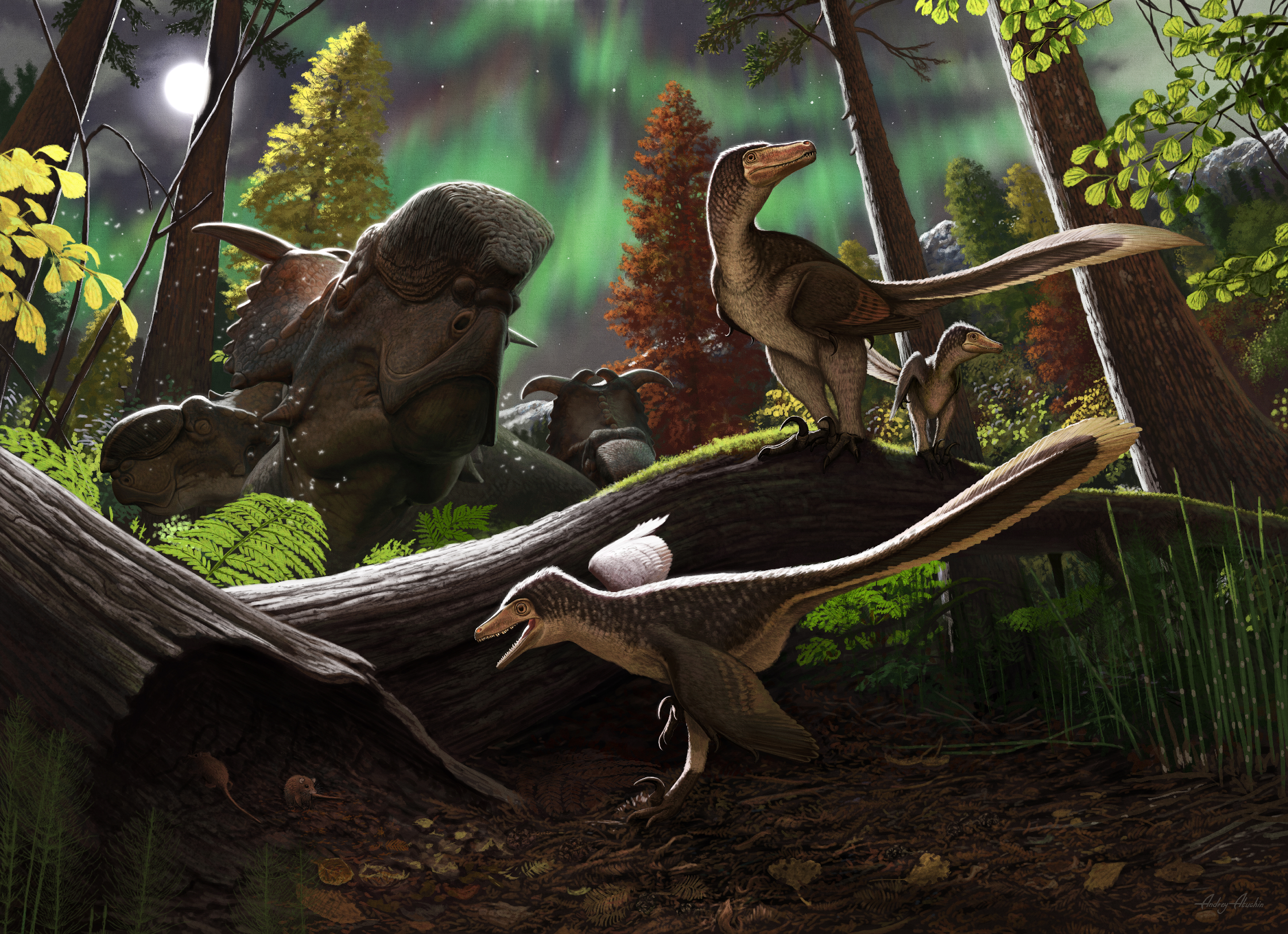
- Andrey Atuchin's illustration of the paleoenvironment of Prince Creek Formation
- Type: Geological formation
- Unit of: Colville Group
- Sub-units: Kikak-Tegoseak Quarry, Kogosukruk Tongue, Ocean Point, Coleville River Bluff
- Underlies: Sagavanirktok Formation
- Overlies: Schrader Bluff Formation

Lithology
- Primary: Sandstone, mudstone
- Other: siltstone, carbonaceous shale, ash-fall

Location
- Coordinates: 70.0°N 151.5°W
- Approximate paleocoordinates: 80°N 115°W
- Region: Alaska
- Country: United States
- Prince Creek Formation (Alaska)

The Prince Creek Formation is a geological formation in Alaska with strata dating to the Campanian and Maastrichtian stages of the Late Cretaceous and the Danian and Selandian stages of the Paleocene. Dinosaur remains are among the fossils that have been recovered from the formation.

== Age ==
The PCF ranges from Late Cretaceous (Campanian) to Paleocene in age. Due to a slight structural dip, the unit becomes progressively younger downriver (northward). Biostratigraphic analyses from the upper, vertebrate-bearing portion of the unit near Ocean Point indicate a temporal range from as old as late Campanian to as young as late Maastrichtian. Although previous radiometric dating suggested an early Maastrichtian age, more recent work indicates the fossiliferous beds near Ocean Point to be late Campanian in age (Druckenmiller et al. 2023).

== Habitat ==
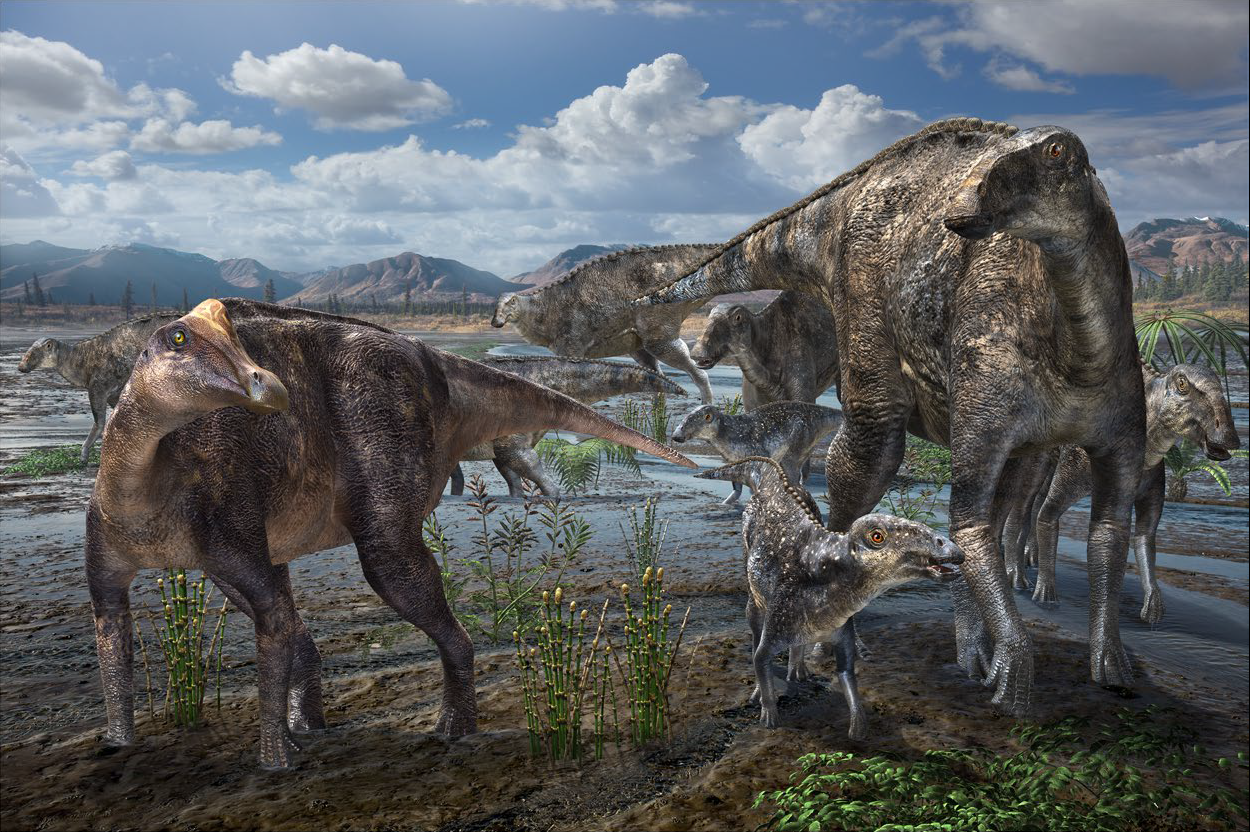
Hadrosaurids of the Liscomb Bonebed in their habitat

During the time when the fossiliferous beds were deposited, Earth was going through a global cooling phase. The depositional environment included tidally influenced meandering rivers, anastomosed distributary channels, crevasse splays, levees, lakes, ponds, and mires. Large amounts of plants material are represented by peridonoid dinocysts, algae, fungal hyphae, fern and moss spores, projectates, Wodehouseia edmontonicola, bisaccate pollen, taxodiaceous pollen, and pollen from trees, shrubs, and herbs. False rings observed in the dendrochronology of the stumps were likely to have been caused by sudden drops below 10 °C (50 °F) due to fluctuating summer temperatures, but other explanations are possible such as insect damage, flood and drought. Methodologies using oxygen-18 isotope values from fossil vertebrate to estimate average meteoric water temperature have estimated a mean air temperature of around 5 °C (41 °F) for the north slope of Alaska. However there is a growing controversy about temperature estimates from stable isotope tracers during greenhouse conditions, their distributions do not align with the modern global meteoric water line making these results questionable. High but variable mean annual precipitation with low values of 350 to 1200mm/yr and high values of 1000 and 3900mm/yr suggests the presence of an intensified hydrological cycle which enhanced heat transport to the poles. This data supports the interpretation of greenhouse conditions in the Maastrichtian paleo-Arctic.

North of Oceans Point, a section of non-marine deposits represent moderately to poorly consolidated conglomerate, sand, gravelly-sand as well as pebbly shale with thin coal beds and lignitised logs. Many gravel clasts are composed of rock types which do not occur in the nearby parts of the Brooks Range, arguing against the source of local bedrock fragmentation. These clasts are as large as 1.2 meters in diameter with some bearing faceted surfaces characteristic of glacial transportation, though not by iceberg transport, as indicated by the non-marine deposition. These deposits are later assigned a Maastrichtian to lowermost Tertiary age, though recent radiometric revisions in age of older strata could suggest a slightly older age. Palynological assemblages here are characterised by a depauperate assemblage of Betulaceae, Myricaceae, Ulmaceae, Ericales, Pinaceae, Taxodiaceae, various Tracheophytes and Sphagnum. The paleolatitude of the formation at the time of deposition was around 80°N, high in the Arctic Circle, and would have likely experienced 120 days of winter darkness.

== Vertebrate paleofauna ==
=== Dinosaurs ===
==== Theropods ====
Indeterminate tyrannosaurid remains are present, mostly in the form of teeth. The teeth are from the Kikak-Tegoseak Quarry, Liscomb Quarry, and Byers Bed, totaling 8 teeth. Fossils of crown or near-crown birds as well as members of Hesperornithes and Ichthyornithes have been reported in 2025, providing the oldest evidence of birds nesting at polar latitudes reported to date.

Color key: Taxon / Reclassified taxon / Taxon falsely reported as present / Dubious taxon or junior synonym / Ichnotaxon / Ootaxon / Morphotaxon	Notes; Uncertain or tentative taxa are in small text; ~~crossed out~~ taxa are discredited.

Theropods of the Prince Creek Formation
Genus	Species	Location	Abundance	Notes	Images
Dromaeosaurus	D. cf albertensis	Liscomb Quarry Kikak-Tegoseak Quarry Byers Bed	Fossilized teeth	A dromaeosaur.	
Ornithomimosauria indet.	Indeterminate	Old Bone Beach	Distal metatarsal IV	Possibly an ornithomimid.	
Saurornitholestinae indet.	Indeterminate	Pediomys Point - Liscomb Quarry	Small dentary tip from a juvenile.	A new species of dromaeosaurid closely related to Saurornitholestes.	
Nanuqsaurus	N. hoglundi	Kikak-Tegoseak Quarry	One partial skull including a bone near the front of the maxilla and the front of the lower jaw.	Nanuqsaurus is a tyrannosaurid closely related to Lythronax, Tyrannosaurus, and Tarbosaurus.	
Saurornitholestes	S. cf. langstoni	Old Bone Beach	Teeth	A dromaeosaur.	
Troodon	T. sp	Kikak-Tegoseak Quarry Liscomb Quarry Byers Bed Magical Mystery Bar	Dental remains, including teeth. Braincases have also been found.	Remains of T. sp. are approximately 50% larger than specimens from Alberta and Montana. Remains were previously assigned to T. formosus. The most abundant theropod. As of 2011, a dubious genus.	

==== Ornithischians ====
Color key: Taxon / Reclassified taxon / Taxon falsely reported as present / Dubious taxon or junior synonym / Ichnotaxon / Ootaxon / Morphotaxon	Notes; Uncertain or tentative taxa are in small text; ~~crossed out~~ taxa are discredited.

Ornithischians of the Prince Creek Formation
Genus	Species	Location	Abundance	Notes	Images
Alaskacephale	A. gangloffi	Kogosukruk Tongue	A squamosal, and the back of the dome.	The first pachycephalosaurine from Alaska discovered.	
Pachyrhinosaurus	P. perotorum	Kikak-Tegoseak Quarry	An abundance of skeletal remains, including an immature juvenile.	The youngest of the Pachyrhinosaurus species, found in one of the highest latitudes of centrosaurine discoveries. A discovery in the Kikak-Tegoseak Quarry was identified in 2013 as a juvenile of Pachyrhinosaurus perotorum. This discovery shows that the crest started to develop in the front of the snout, then extending farther back until it reaches the eye.	
Thescelosaurinae indet.	Indeterminate		Teeth	Remains previously attributed to Thescelosaurus.	
Leptoceratopsidae	Indeterminate		Remains of adult and juvenile individuals		
Edmontosaurus	E. cf. regalis	Liscomb Bonebed; Kikak-Tegoseak Quarry	Disassociated parts from multiple juveniles	Originally identified as a distinct genus (Ugrunaaluk), recent studies have found it ontogenetically indistinguishable from Edmontosaurus.	
Lambeosaurinae indet.	Indeterminate	Liscomb Bonebed	A supraoccipital	The first confirmed lambeosaurine in the Prince Creek Formation.	
Ornithopoda indet.	Indeterminate		One tooth	A single "hypsilophodontid" cheek tooth not attributable to Parksosaurus or Thescelosaurus.	

=== Mammals ===
Mammals of the Prince Creek Formation
Genus	Species	Location	Stratigraphic position	Abundance	Notes	Images
Camurodon	C. borealis	Pediomys Point	Upper Campanian	Isolated teeth	A cimolomyid multituberculate.	
Gypsonictops	G. sp.		Lower Maastrichtian	Isolated teeth	A small eutherian.	
Kaniqsiqcosmodon	K. polaris	OJsaurus bone bed	Upper Campanian	Isolated teeth	A microcosmodontid multituberculate.	
Multituberculata indet.	Indeterminate		Lower Maastrichtian	Isolated teeth		
Marsupialia indet.	Indeterminate		Lower Maastrichtian	Most common in the Prince Creek Formation		
Qayaqgruk	Q. peregrinus	Pediomys Point	Upper Campanian	Isolated teeth	A djadochtatheriid multituberculate	
Sikuomys	S. mikros	Lower Colville River.	Upper Campanian		A tiny eutherian.	
Unnuakomys	U. hutchisoni	Pediomys Point	Lower Maastrichtian	Over 60 specimens	A small metatherian.	

=== Cartilaginous fish ===
Cartilaginous fishes of the Prince Creek Formation
Genus	Species	Location	Stratigraphic position	Abundance	Notes	Images
Squatina	S. sp.				An angelshark.	

=== Ray-finned fish ===
Ray-finned fishes of the Prince Creek Formation
Genus	Species	Location	Stratigraphic position	Abundance	Notes	Images
Acipenseridae indet.					A sturgeon.	
Archaeosiilik	A. gilmulli				A esocid salmoniform	
?Beryciformes indet.					Acanthomorph remains reminiscent of beryciforms.	
Cypriniformes indet.					A cypriniform, the oldest record of this order.	
Horseshoeichthys	H. armaserratus				An armigatid ellimmichthyiform.	
Neopterygii indet.					A potential basal neopterygian, known from a scale similar to Belonostomus.	
Nunikuluk	N. gracilis				A esocid salmoniform	
Oldmanesox	O. canadensis				An esocid salmoniform.	
Polyodontidae indet.					A paddlefish, potentially represented by two distinct forms.	
Sivulliusalmo	S. alaskensis				A salmonid salmoniform, the oldest record of this family.	

== Plants ==
A Reinvestigation of the Parataxodium-type flora has revealed the assemblage was far more diverse than previously thought. However, this sedimentary block's stratigraphic origins are uncertain. No other in situ limestone blocks comparable to the Parataxodium-type flora have been located along the Colville River. Rivers upstream from the point of discovery cut through Upper Cretaceous deposits that range in age from Late Albian to Cenomanian. The diversity of flora present is more consistent with the Tuluvak Formation, which is dated to the Turonian-Coniacian.

Color key: Taxon / Reclassified taxon / Taxon falsely reported as present / Dubious taxon or junior synonym / Ichnotaxon / Ootaxon / Morphotaxon	Notes; Uncertain or tentative taxa are in small text; ~~crossed out~~ taxa are discredited.

Plants of the Prince Creek Formation
Genus	Species	Location	Abundance	Notes	Images
Parataxodium	P. wigginsii	Kogosukruk Tongue?		Previously thought to represent a single taxon, now shown to have included many distinct conifer morphotypes.	
Oncophoraceae indet.		Kogosukruk Tongue?		A Dicranalean moss.	
Osmundastrum	O. cinnamomeum	Kogosukruk Tongue?		This species is still extant in the Eastern United States and most of Asia.	
Ginkgo	G. adiantoides	Kogosukruk Tongue?			
Pityophyllum	P. nordenskioldii	Kogosukruk Tongue?		Pinaceous needles.	
Sequioideae indet.		Kogosukruk Tongue?		Previously included in Parataxodium.	
Taiwanioideae indet.		Kogosukruk Tongue?		Previously included in Parataxodium.	
Cryptomerioideae indet.		Kogosukruk Tongue?		Previously included in Parataxodium.	
Athrotaxoideae indet.		Kogosukruk Tongue?		Previously included in Parataxodium.	
Archeampelos	A. sp.	Kogosukruk Tongue?			
Cf. Cercidiphyllum	cf. C. sp.	Kogosukruk Tongue?			
Dicotyledon indet.	Morphotype 2	Kogosukruk Tongue?			
Dicotyledon indet.	Morphotype 3	Kogosukruk Tongue?			
Dicotyledon indet.	Morphotype 4	Kogosukruk Tongue?			
Monocotyledon indet.		Kogosukruk Tongue?			
Hollickia	H. quercifolia	Kogosukruk Tongue	Leaves	An angiosperm, known from leaves.	
Quereuxia	Q. angulata	Kogosukruk Tongue		An aquatic angiosperm.	
Equisetites	E. sp.	Kogosukruk Tongue		A sphenophyte.	
Pulcheripollenites	P. krempii	Coleville River Bluff	Pollen spores	Also found in the Schrader Bluff Formation.	
cf. Proteacidites	cf. P. sp.	Coleville River Bluff	Pollen spores	Also found in the Schrader Bluff Formation.	
cf. Polycingulatisporites	cf. P. reduncus	Coleville River Bluff	Pollen spores	Also found in the Schrader Bluff Formation.	
Podocarpidites	P. sp.	Coleville River Bluff	Pollen spores	Also found in the Schrader Bluff Formation.	
Ovoidites	O.? sp.	Coleville River Bluff	Pollen spores	Also found in the Schrader Bluff Formation.	
Ovoidites	O. sp.	Coleville River Bluff	Pollen spores	Also found in the Schrader Bluff Formation.	
Ovoidites	O. parvus	Coleville River Bluff	Pollen spores	Also found in the Schrader Bluff Formation.	
Ovoidites	O. arcticus	Coleville River Bluff	Pollen spores	Also found in the Schrader Bluff Formation.	
Osmundacidites	O. wellmanii	Coleville River Bluff	Pollen remains	Common in the Early Maastrichtian. Also found in the Schrader Bluff Formation.	
Mantonisporites	M. sp. indet.	Coleville River Bluff	Pollen remains	Also found in the Schrader Bluff Formation.	
Mancicorpus	M. pseudosenonicus	Coleville River Bluff	Pollen remains	Also found in the Schrader Bluff Formation.	
Lycopodiacidites	L. sp.	Coleville River Bluff	Pollen remains	Also found in the Schrader Bluff Formation.	
Lunatadinium	L. dissolutum	Coleville River Bluff	Pollen remains	Also found in the Schrader Bluff Formation.	
Indeterminate		Coleville River Bluff	Septate fungal hypha.	Also found in the Schrader Bluff Formation.	
Leosphaeridia	L."stellata"	Coleville River Bluff	Pollen remains	Common in the Early Maastrichtian. Also found in the Schrader Bluff Formation.	
Lairidordites	L. magnus	Coleville River Bluff	Pollen remains	Also found in the Schrader Bluff Formation.	
Laegivatosporites	L. sp.	Coleville River Bluff	Pollen remains	Indeterminate remains are abundant in the Early Maastrichtian and still numerous in the Late Maastrichtian. Also found in the Schrader Bluff Formation.	
Laegivatosporites	L. sp.	Coleville River Bluff	Pollen remains	Also found in the Schrader Bluff Formation.	
Kurtzipites	K. trispissatus	Coleville River Bluff	Pollen remains	Also found in the Schrader Bluff Formation.	
Integricorpus	I. sp.	Coleville River Bluff	Pollen remains	Also found in the Schrader Bluff Formation.	
Ischyosporites	I. sp.	Coleville River Bluff	Pollen remains	Also found in the Schrader Bluff Formation.	
Inundatisporis	I. tappaniae	Coleville River Bluff	Samples of distinct pollen	Also found in the Schrader Bluff Formation.	
Impardecispora	I. marylandensis	Coleville River Bluff	Samples of distinct pollen	Also found in the Schrader Bluff Formation.	
Hannisporis	H. scollardensis	Coleville River Bluff	Samples of distinct pollen	Also found in the Schrader Bluff Formation.	
Hannisporis	H. amplus	Coleville River Bluff	Samples of distinct pollen	Also found in the Schrader Bluff Formation.	
Gleicheniidites	G. senonicus	Coleville River Bluff	Samples of distinct pollen	Also found in the Schrader Bluff Formation.	
Foveosporites	F sp.	Coleville River Bluff	Samples of distinct pollen	Also found in the Schrader Bluff Formation.	
Foraminisporis	F. undulosus	Coleville River Bluff	Samples of distinct pollen	Also found in the Schrader Bluff Formation.	
Fibulapollis	F. scabratus	Coleville River Bluff	Samples of distinct pollen	Also found in the Schrader Bluff Formation.	
Expressipollis	cf. E. accuratus	Coleville River Bluff	Samples of distinct pollen	Also found in the Schrader Bluff Formation.	
Erdtmannipollis	E. procumbentformis	Coleville River Bluff	Pollen spores	Also found in the Schrader Bluff Formation.	
Dictyophyllidites	D. sp.	Coleville River Bluff	Pollen remains	Also found in the Schrader Bluff Formation.	
Deltoidospora	D. sp.	Coleville River Bluff	Preserved pollen samples	Very abundant in the early Maastrichtian and Indeterminate level of the formation, becoming rarer until the Middle/Late Maastrichtian. Also found in the Schrader Bluff Formation.	
Cycadopites	C. fragilis	Coleville River Bluff	Samples of distinct pollen	Also found in the Schrader Bluff Formation.	
Crassispora?	cf. C. apisulacea	Coleville River Bluff	Pollen samples	Also found in the Schrader Bluff Formation.	
cf. Converrucosisporites	cf. C. sp.	Coleville River Bluff	Specimens of preserved pollen spores	Also found in the Schrader Bluff Formation.	
Clavatisporites	C. sp.	Coleville River Bluff	Preserved pollen samples	Also found in the Schrader Bluff Formation.	
Circulodinium	C. sp.	Coleville River Bluff	Pollen samples	Also found in the Schrader Bluff Formation.	
Cingutriletes	cf. C. congruens	Coleville River Bluff	Pollen remains	Also found in the Schrader Bluff Formation.	
Cingulizonates	C. bialatus	Coleville River Bluff	Pollen samples	Also found in the Schrader Bluff Formation.	
Cicatricosisporites	C. sp. 1	Coleville River Bluff	Distinct pollen remains	Also found in the Schrader Bluff Formation.	
Cicatricosisporites	C. sp. 2	Coleville River Bluff	Preserved pollen	Also found in the Schrader Bluff Formation.	
Cicatricosisporites	cf. C. dorogensis	Coleville River Bluff	Fossilized pollen spores	Also found in the Schrader Bluff Formation.	
Cibotiumspora	C. sp.	Coleville Bluff Formation	Pollen spores	Also found in the Schrader Bluff Formation.	
Camarozonosporites	C. ambigens	Coleville River Bluff	Pollen specimens	Also found in the Schrader Bluff Formation.	
Botryococcus	B. braunii	Coleville River Bluff	Pollen	Also found in the Schrader Bluff Formation.	
Botryococcus	Indeterminate	Coleville River Bluff	Bissacate gymnosperm pollen	Also found in the Schrader Bluff Formation.	
Balmeisporites	B. sp.	Coleville River Bluff	Pollen spore remains	Also found in the Schrader Bluff Formation.	
Azonia	cf. A. cribrata	Coleville River Bluff	Carbonized pollen	Also found in the Schrader Bluff Formation.	
Aquilapollenites	A. trialatus	Coleville River Bluff	Pollen	Also found in the Schrader Bluff Formation.	
Aquilapollenites	A. sp. 2	Coleville River Bluff	Pollen	Also found in the Schrader Bluff Formation.	
Aquilapollenites	A. sp. 3	Coleville River Bluff	Pollen	Also found in the Schrader Bluff Formation.	
Aquilapollenites	cf. A. dentatus	Coleville River Bluff	Pollen	Also found in the Schrader Bluff Formation.	
Aquilapollenites	A. amygdaloides	Coleville River Bluff	Pollen	Numerous in the Late Campanian, becoming abundant in the Maastrichtian. Also found in the Schrader Bluff Formation.	
Annulispora	A. sp.	Coleville River Bluff	Pollen	Also found in the Schrader Bluff Formation.	
Anacololsidites	A. sp. 1	Coleville River Bluff	Pollen	Also found in the Schrader Bluff Formation.	
Anacololsidites	A. sp. 2	Coleville River Bluff	Pollen	Also found in the Schrader Bluff Formation.	
Alete	A. clavate	Coleville River Formation	Pollen	Also found in the Schrader Bluff Formation.	
Aequitriradites	cf. A. spinulosus	Coleville River Bluff	Pollen	Also found in the Schrader Bluff Formation.	
Aequitriradite	A. sp.	Coleville River Bluff	Pollen	Also found in the Schrader Bluff Formation.	

== See also ==
- List of dinosaur-bearing rock formations
