= Magnoavipes denaliensis =

Scientific classification
- Kingdom: Animalia
- Phylum: Chordata
- Class: Reptilia
- Clade: Dinosauria
- Clade: Saurischia
- Clade: Theropoda
- Clade: †Ornithomimosauria
- Ichnofamily: †Ornithomimipodidae
- Ichnogenus: †Magnoavipes
- Species: †M. denaliensis

Binomial name
- †Magnoavipes denaliensis Fiorillo et al., 2011

Extinct species of bird

Magnoavipes denaliensis is an extinct bird ichnospecies from the Cretaceous period. As one of the ichnofauna, it is known only from trace fossils. Its footprints were discovered within the Cantwell Formation at Tattler Creek in Denali National Park and Preserve, Alaska; the species is named after Denali. Evidence of the bird has not been confirmed at any other locations, though it may have been migratory. The fossils identifying the species are approximately 70 million years old.

== Description ==
Magnoavipes denaliensis had feet that averaged 20 centimeters long and 20 cm wide, larger than most other fossilized bird footprints. The foot had three toes, each with a sharp claw and a prominent toe pad, and the toes formed divarication angles of 97–116 degrees. It is differentiated from other species in the ichnogenus, M. lowei, which lacked toe pads, and M. caneeri, which had narrower toe divarication angles. It was likely of a similar height as the sandhill crane and is thought to have been a piscivorous wading bird. It has been described as being similar to a modern heron or crane.

The location of the fossils' discovery is in the region that once formed the Bering land bridge, which facilitated animal migrations between Asia and North America during the time of M. denaliensis. The genus name Magnoavipes means "bird with large feet" and the species name denaliensis means "found in Denali".

In 2019, fossilized bird footprints were discovered in the Chignik Formation at Alaska's Aniakchak National Monument that were described as resembling those of M. denaliensis, though the tracks had greater divarication angles than those of this ichnospecies.
