= Clathroctenocystis =

Scientific classification
- Domain: Eukaryota
- (unranked): SAR
- (unranked): Alveolata
- Phylum: Dinoflagellata
- Class: Dinophyceae
- Order: Gonyaulacales
- Family: Microdiniaceae
- Genus: †Clathroctenocystis V. D. Wiggins, 1972

Species
- Clathroctenocystis elegans Wiggins, 1972 (type)

Extinct genus of single-celled organisms

Clathroctenocystis is an extinct monotypic genus of dinoflagellates in the family Microdiniaceae. The type species, C. elegans, is from the Lower Cretaceous of Nelchina Limestone and Staniukovich formations of Southern Alaska, USA.
