= Fossil Creek Volcanics =

Geological formation in Alaska, USA

- Stratigraphic range: Ordovician
- Type: Formation

Location
- Region: Alaska
- Country: United States

The Fossil Creek Volcanics is a geologic formation in Alaska. It preserves fossils dating back to the Ordovician period.

== See also ==
- List of fossiliferous stratigraphic units in Alaska
- Paleontology in Alaska
