= Slana Spur Formation =

Geologic formation in Alaska, United States

- Stratigraphic range: Permian
- Type: Formation
- Unit of: Skolai Group

Location
- Region: Alaska
- Country: United States

The Slana Spur Formation is a geological formation in Alaska. It preserves fossils dating back to the Permian period.

== See also ==
- List of fossiliferous stratigraphic units in Alaska
- Paleontology in Alaska
