= Adams Argillite Formation =

Geologic formation in Alaska, United States

- Stratigraphic range: Cambrian
- Type: Formation
- Thickness: up to 600 feet (180 m)

Lithology
- Primary: Quartzite, slate
- Other: Argillate, limestone

Location
- Region: Alaska
- Country: United States

The Adams Argillite Formation is a geologic formation in Alaska. It preserves fossils dating back to the Cambrian period.

== See also ==
- List of fossiliferous stratigraphic units in Alaska
- Paleontology in Alaska
