= Telsitna Formation =

Geologic formation in Alaska, United States

- Stratigraphic range: Middle to Late Ordovician
- Type: Formation
- Unit of: Nixon Fork terrane carbonate succession
- Underlies: Younger Silurian carbonate and clastic units (locally unconformable)
- Overlies: Novi Mountain Formation

Lithology
- Primary: Limestone
- Other: Dolomite, Siltstone

Location
- Region: Kuskokwim Mountains, Alaska
- Country: United States
- Extent: West-central Alaska (Nixon Fork terrane)

Type section
- Named for: Telsitna River region, Alaska
- Named by: Dutro Jr. & Patton Jr. (1982)

The Telsitna Formation is a geologic formation in Alaska. It is part of the older rock record exposed in the Kuskokwim Mountains region, within the Nixon Fork terrane. The formation preserves evidence of an ancient shallow sea that once covered part of Alaska, recording a stage in the early Paleozoic development of the Laurentian northern margin.

The formation consists mainly of carbonate rocks, such as limestone and related sediments that formed in a shallow tropical to subtropical sea. It sits above older Ordovician stratigraphic units and is overlain by younger Paleozoic features, reflecting a long history of changing sea levels and environments in the region.

== See also ==
- List of fossiliferous stratigraphic units in Alaska
- Paleontology in Alaska
