= Cantwell Formation =

Geologic formation in Alaska, United States

- Stratigraphic range: Cretaceous
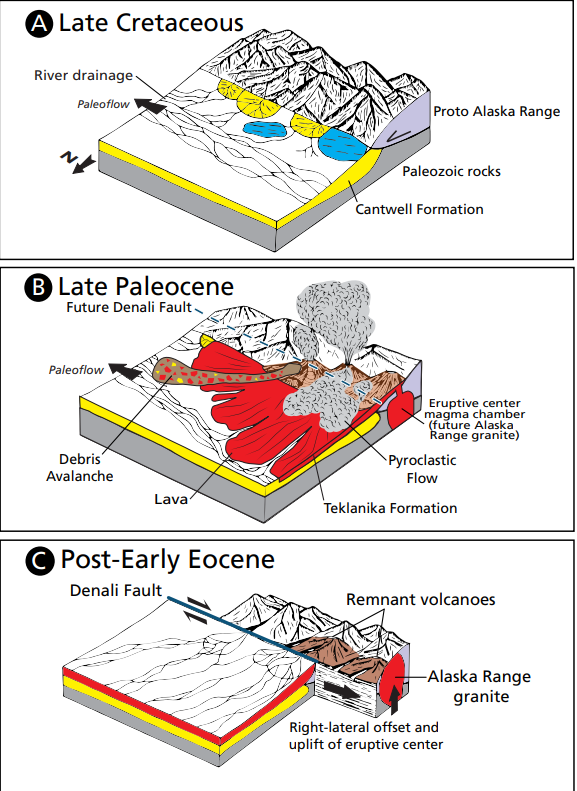
- Denali National Park tectonic history
- Type: Formation

Location
- Region: Alaska
- Country: United States

The Cantwell Formation is a geologic formation in Alaska. It preserves fossils dating back to the Cretaceous period, it has also yielded numerous dinosaur tracks at Denali National Park. Contemporary therizinosaurid and hadrosaurid trackways in the formation indicate that the area was once a major point of immigration between Asia and North America during the Late Cretaceous for many families of dinosaur. Fossil plants of water lilies found in the same area suggest the presence of wetlands, ponds or other large standing bodies of water.

Footprints discovered in the formation include those of theropods, hadrosaurs, ceratopsians, pterosaurs and birds, notably the Magnoavipes denaliensis.

== Description ==
The Cantwell Formation represents a Late Cretaceous fluvial succession in Denali National Park containing dinosaur trackways, invertebrate traces, and plant fossils. Sedimentary facies represent a lateral succession from alluvial fan and braided river deposits, to coastal fluvial and lacustrine environments with marshy overbanks, proximal estuary consisting of laterally avulsed distributary channels, intertidal estuarine deposits, and finally tidally influenced marginal marine environments.

A leaf analysis of the Sable Mountain flora was used to estimate a mean annual temperature of 7.42 °C (45.36 °F), a warm month mean temperature of 17.1 °C (62.8 °F), and a cold month mean temperature of −2.3 °C (27.9 °F). Growing season precipitation was estimated at 229.4 millimetres (9.03 in) over a period of 4.8 months. These results demonstrate a cool temperate, seasonal paleoclimate with short, dry summers and cold, wet winters. Dating of ash layers in the formation indicate this floral assemblage straddled the Campanian-Maastrichtian boundary, a period of rapid global cooling.

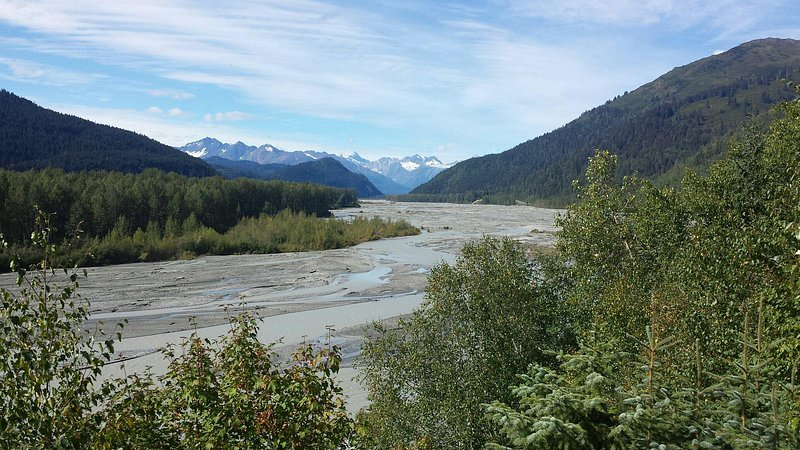
The Cantwell Formation represents a sedimentary basin adjacent to uplifting mountains

== Flora ==
Color key: Taxon / Reclassified taxon / Taxon falsely reported as present / Dubious taxon or junior synonym / Ichnotaxon / Ootaxon / Morphotaxon	Notes; Uncertain or tentative taxa are in small text; ~~crossed out~~ taxa are discredited.

Taxa	Species	Locality	Material	Notes	Images
Alnites	A. sp.			Similar to extant Alnus.	
Asplenium	A. sp.				
Cf. Castaliites	cf. C. sp.		Leaf morphotaxon.		
Cephalotaxopsis	C. sp.			Belongs to Taxaceae.	
Corylites	C. beringianus			Similar to extant Corylus.	
Cladophlebis	C. sp.				
Cf. Craspedodromophyllum	cf. C. sp.			Belongs to Betulaceae.	
Equisetum	E. arcticum				
Glyptostrobus	G. sp.				
Fagales indet.			Leaf morphotypes.	Belongs to the “Higher Hamamelids”.	
Cf. Kenella	cf. K. sp.		Seeds		
Larix	L. sp.		Needle bundles.	Originally described as Cf. Pseudolarix.	
Metasequoia	M. occidentalis				
Menispermites	M. septentrionalis			Belongs to Menispermaceae.	
Menispermites	M. sp.			Another Menispermoid.	
Cf. Nuphar	cf. N. sp.			Similar to extant Nuphar.	
Parataxodium?	Indeterminate			In need of revision.	
Cf. Phragmites	cf. P. sp.				
Picea	P. sp.		Needles, ovuliferous cone.		
Pinus	P. sp.		Needle bundles.		
Pityophyllum?	indeterminate			Indeterminate Pinaceous needles.	
Platanites	P. sp.			Belongs to Platanaceae.	
Pseudoprotophyllum	P. sp.			Another Platanoid.	
Cf. Sparganium	cf. S. sp.				
Trochodendroides	T. richardsonii			Belongs to Cercidiphyllaceae.	
Trochodendroides	T. sp.			A Trochodendroid.	
Tumion	T. gracilis				
Cf. Viburniphyll	cf. V. sp.			Similar to extant Viburnum.	
Cf. Zizyphoides	cf. Z. sp.			Another Trochodendroid.	

== See also ==
- List of fossiliferous stratigraphic units in Alaska
- Paleontology in Alaska
