= Microdiniaceae =

Scientific classification
- Domain: Eukaryota
- (unranked): SAR
- (unranked): Alveolata
- Phylum: Dinoflagellata
- Class: Dinophyceae
- Order: Gonyaulacales
- Family: Microdiniaceae Eisenack, 1964 emend. Sarjeant and Downie, 1972

Genera
- Clathroctenocystis; Microdinium (type)

Family of single-celled organisms

Microdiniaceae is a family of dinoflagellates in the order Gonyaulacales.
