= Devils Gate Limestone =

Geologic formation in Nevada, United States

- Stratigraphic range: Devonian
- Type: Formation
- Underlies: Pilot Shale
- Overlies: Nevada Formation, Lone Mountain Dolomite
- Thickness: 1,200 feet (370 m)

Lithology
- Primary: Limestone

Location
- Region: Nevada
- Country: United States

The Devils Gate Limestone is a limestone geologic formation in Nevada.

It preserves fossils dating back to the Devonian period.

== See also ==
- List of fossiliferous stratigraphic units in Nevada
- Paleontology in Nevada
