= Ogilvie Formation =

Geologic formation in Alaska

- Stratigraphic range: Devonian
- Type: Formation

Location
- Region: Alaska, Yukon
- Country: United States, Canada

The Ogilvie Formation is a geologic formation in Alaska. It preserves fossils dating back to the Devonian period.

== See also ==
- List of fossiliferous stratigraphic units in Alaska
- Paleontology in Alaska
