= Chickaloon Formation =

Geologic formation in Alaska, United States

- Stratigraphic range: Thanetian–Ypresian; ~59–50 Ma
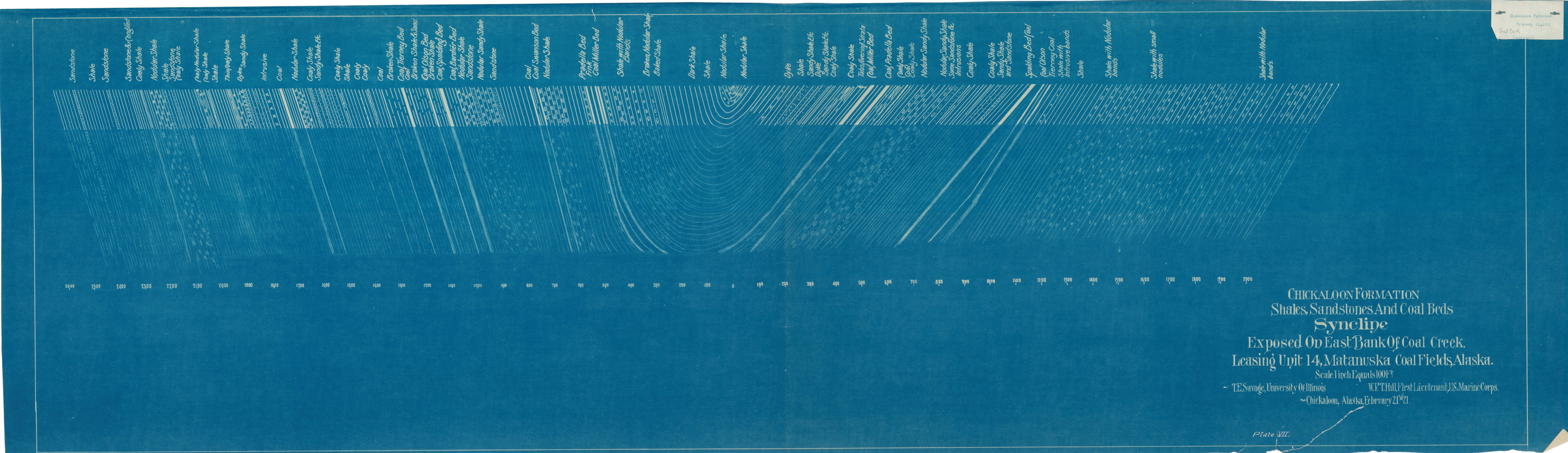
- Exposed shales, sandstones, and coal beds of the Chickaloon Formation at Coal Creek, Alaska
- Type: Formation
- Unit of: Matanuska–Susitna basin sedimentary sequence
- Sub-units: Informal coal-bearing and fluvial facies divisions
- Underlies: (varies locally; younger Eocene units in Cook Inlet–Matanuska region)
- Overlies: Mesozoic basement and/or Upper Cretaceous strata (locally unconformable)
- Thickness: Several thousand meters (locally variable)

Lithology
- Primary: Sandstone, siltstone, shale, mudstone, conglomerate
- Other: Coal

Location
- Region: Matanuska Valley, Alaska
- Country: United States
- Extent: Matanuska Valley and adjacent basins, south-central Alaska

Type section
- Named for: Chickaloon River area
- Named by: Martin & Katz (1912)

The Chickaloon Formation is a geologic formation in Alaska. It preserves coal measures deposited in a high-latitude basins during the Paleocene–Eocene thermal maximum. It is an important record of high-latitude terrestrial ecosystems during a period of global warmth, providing evidence for how arctic vegetation and ecological interactions responded to elevated temperatures and atmospheric carbon dioxide levels.

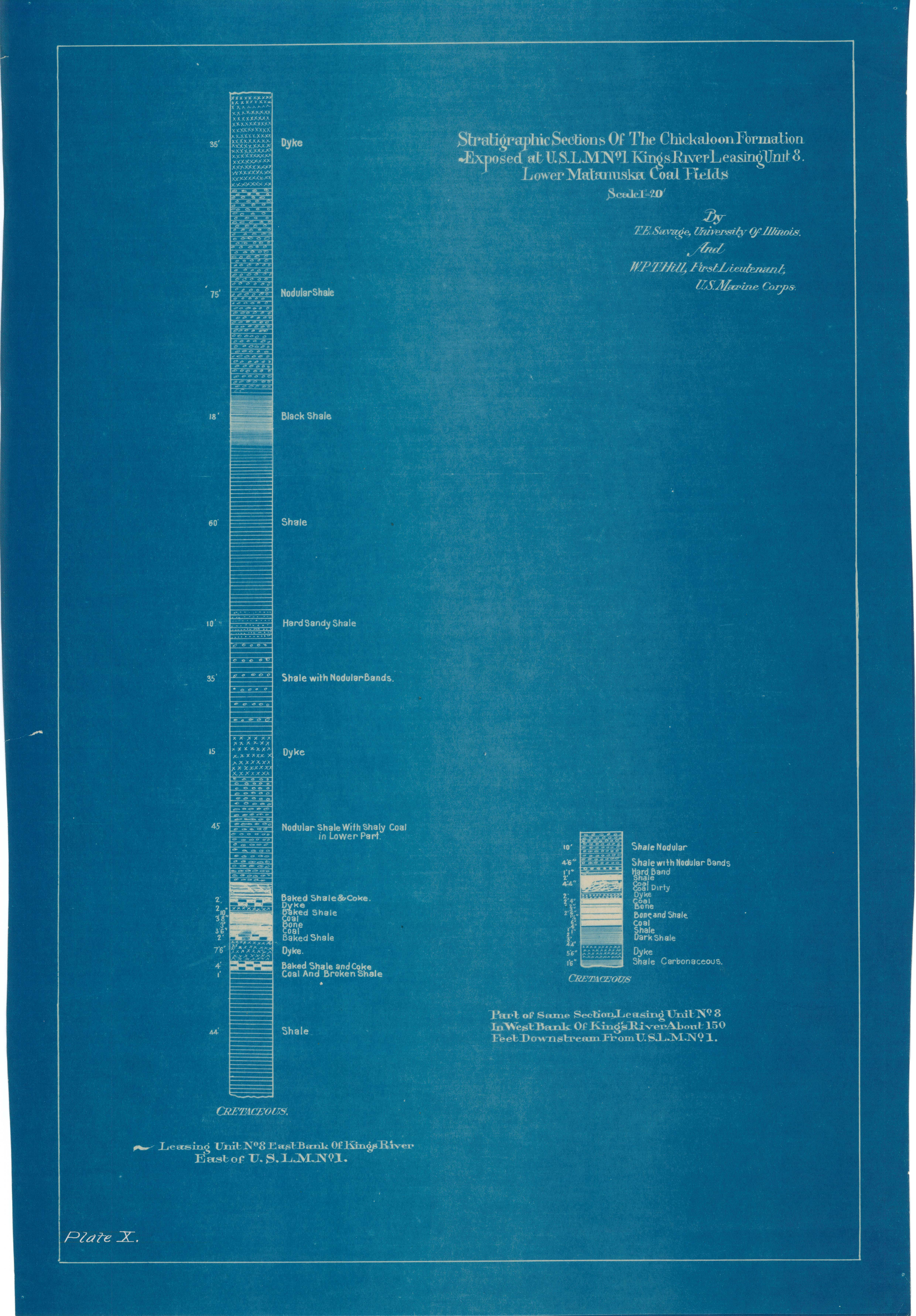
Stratigraphic sections of the Chickaloon Formation

The formation preserves a diverse fossil leaf assemblage derived from floodplain and crevasse splay environments within fluvial sediment processes. These plant fossils represent a forested ecosystem dominated by a variety of broadleaf trees and conifers, including Metasequoia, along with aquatic and wetland plants. Analysis of leaf characteristics suggests that the region experienced a much warmer and wetter climate than present-day Alaska, with warm-temperate conditions and high precipitation under early Eocene climates.

== See also ==
- List of fossiliferous stratigraphic units in Alaska
- Paleontology in Alaska
