= Unalaska Formation =

Geologic formation

- Stratigraphic range: Miocene Era, Neogene Period
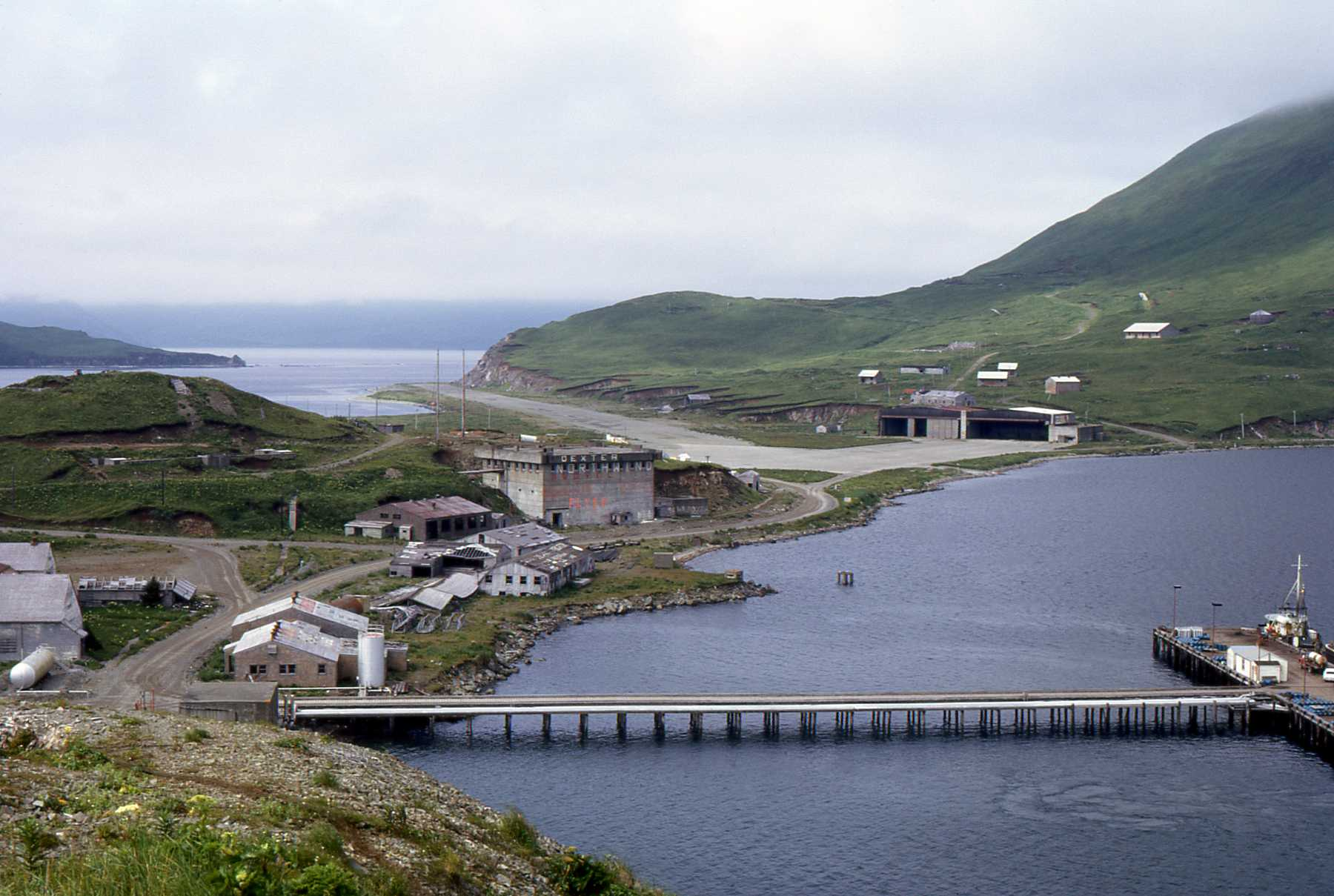
- Outcrops near Dutch Harbor, Unalaska
- Type: Geologic formation
- Overlies: Aleutian Ridge
- Thickness: 900–10,000 metres (3,000–32,800 ft)

Location
- Region: Aleutian Islands, Alaska
- Country: United States

Type section
- Named for: Unalaska Island

The Unalaska Formation is a Miocene Era geologic formation on Amaknak Island and Unalaska Island, in the Aleutian Islands archipelago of southwestern Alaska.

It consists mainly of volcanic breccia, flows, tuff, and intercalated sedimentary rocks. It is exposed over about 70 percent of Unalaska Island. The Dutch Harbor Member is a 126 metres (413 ft) thick Early Miocene sequence of the formation.

It preserves fossils dating back to the Miocene era of the Neogene period.

== See also ==
- List of fossiliferous stratigraphic units in Alaska
- Paleontology in Alaska
