= Tuxedni Group =

Geologic formation in Alaska, United States

Tuxedni Formation
- Stratigraphic range: Bajocian–Bathonian
- Type: Formation
- Underlies: Chinitna Formation
- Thickness: 300-400 m

Lithology
- Primary: sandstone, siltstone and shale

Location
- Region: Alaska
- Country: United States

The Tuxedni Formation is a geologic formation in Alaska. It preserves fossils dating back to the Jurassic period. An indeterminate ophthalmosaurid is known from the formation.

== See also ==
- List of fossiliferous stratigraphic units in Alaska
- Paleontology in Alaska
