= Schrader Bluff Formation =

Alaskan geological formation with fossils

- Stratigraphic range: Late Cretaceous
- Type: Formation
- Underlies: Prince Creek Formation
- Overlies: Tuluvak Formation

Location
- Region: Alaska
- Country: United States

Type section
- Named for: Schrader Bluff on the Anaktuvuk River
- Named by: George Gryc, et al

The Schrader Bluff Formation is a geologic formation in Alaska. It preserves fossils dating back to the Cretaceous period,

Fossil remains include Inoceramus and Scaphites.

Originally named by George Gryc and others as the marine formation of the Colville Group (abandoned).

== See also ==
- List of fossiliferous stratigraphic units in Alaska
- Paleontology in Alaska
