= Narrow Cape Formation =

Geologic formation in Alaska, United States

- Stratigraphic range: Neogene
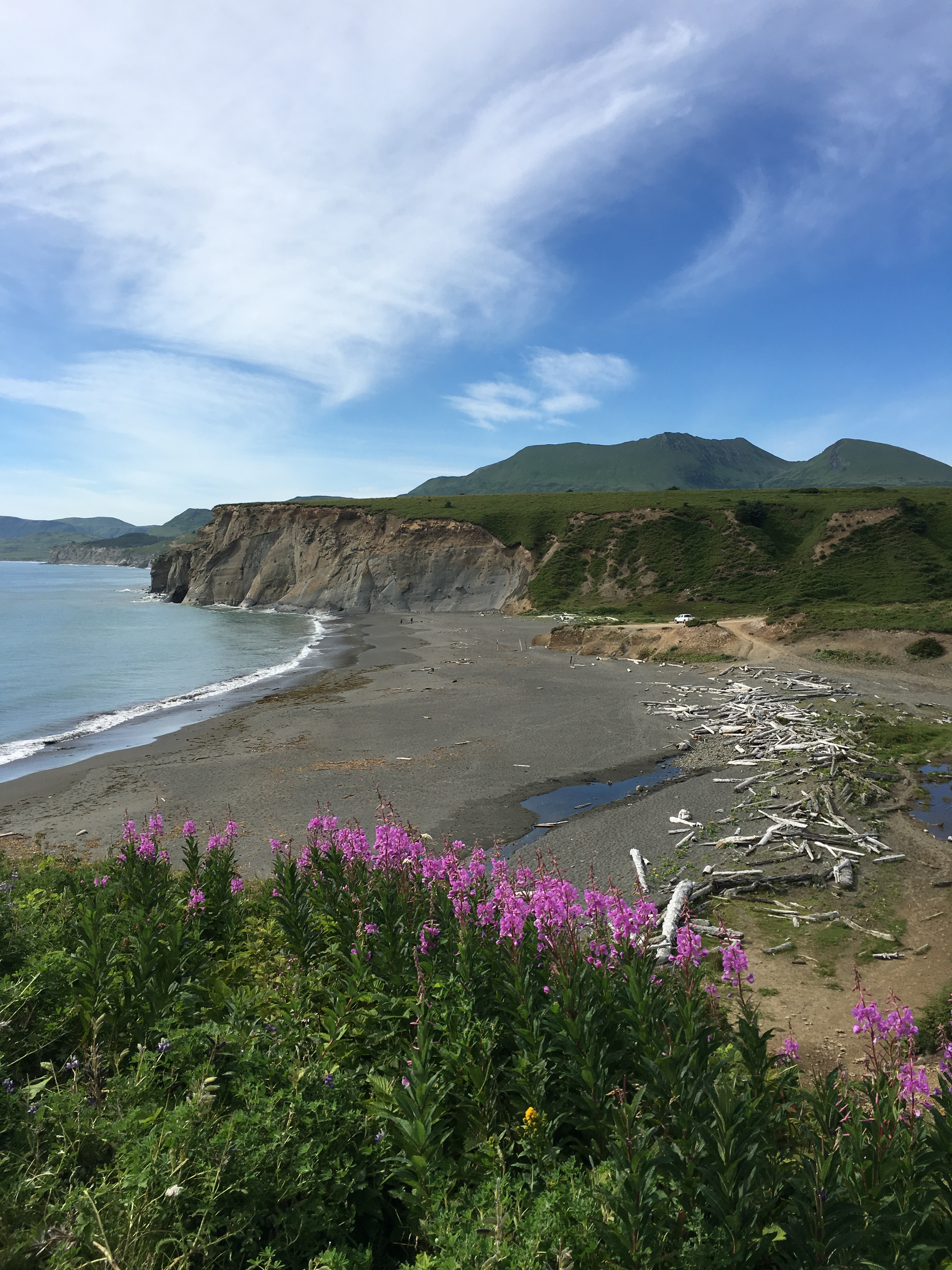
- Outcrops of the Narrow Cape Formation at Fossil Beach, Kodiak Island
- Type: Formation

Location
- Region: Alaska
- Country: United States

The Narrow Cape Formation is a geologic formation in the Kodiak Archipelago, in Alaska. The formation outcrops along Narrow Cape and nearby Ugak Island. It preserves fossils dating back to the Neogene period. Invertebrate fossils are abundant, along with rare vertebrate fossils.

== See also ==
- List of fossiliferous stratigraphic units in Alaska
- Paleontology in Alaska
