= Chinitna Formation =

Geologic formation in Alaska, United States

- Stratigraphic range: Bathonian
- Type: Formation
- Overlies: Tuxedni Formation

Location
- Region: Alaska
- Country: United States

The Chinitna Formation is a geologic formation in Alaska. It preserves fossils dating back to the Jurassic period.

== See also ==
- List of fossiliferous stratigraphic units in Alaska
- Paleontology in Alaska
