= Torok Formation =

Geologic formation in Alaska, United States

- Stratigraphic range: Cretaceous
- Type: Formation

Location
- Region: Alaska
- Country: United States

The Torok Formation is a geologic formation in the National Petroleum Reserve in Alaska (NPR-A). It preserves fossils dating back to the Cretaceous period.

== Geology ==
The Torok Formation lies 2,000–4,000 feet deeper than the Nanushuk Formation. They form a huge wedge of sediment deposited in a deep water basin and stretch from north of the Brooks Range beneath the Alaska North Slope to the adjacent offshore. It contains reservoirs in turbidite sandstone and is very porous. The USGS found large-scale folds and faults in the South of the formation and evidence, that the rocks have been heated to temperatures at which oil is converted to natural gas.

The Torok Formation was deposited on the floor of the Alaska North Slope basin.

== History of oil exploration ==
In 2016, oil discovery in the deeper Torok Formation of more than 1.0 billion barrels (160 million cubic meters) was announced at Smith Bay, less than 1 mile (1.6 km) offshore from the NPR-A. It came at the same time as ConocoPhillips discovery of Willow project, which at 300 million barrels (48 million cubic meters) is less than a third of the size.

== See also ==
- List of fossiliferous stratigraphic units in Alaska
- Paleontology in Alaska
