= Gaikema Formation =

Geologic formation in Alaska, United States

- Stratigraphic range: Jurassic
- Type: Formation

Location
- Region: Alaska
- Country: United States

Gaikema leads here. Dutch cabaret artist, writer, and lyricist, see Seth Gaaikema

The Gaikema Formation is a geologic formation in Alaska. It preserves fossils dating back to the Jurassic period.

== See also ==
- List of fossiliferous stratigraphic units in Alaska
- Paleontology in Alaska
