= McCarthy Formation =

Geologic formation in Alaska, United States

- Stratigraphic range: Triassic
- Type: Formation

Location
- Region: Alaska
- Country: United States

The McCarthy Formation is a geologic formation in Alaska. It preserves fossils dating back to the Triassic period.

== See also ==
- List of fossiliferous stratigraphic units in Alaska
- Paleontology in Alaska
