= Lone Mountain Dolomite =

Geologic formation in Nevada, United States

- Stratigraphic range: Silurian period
- Type: Geologic formation
- Underlies: Nevada Formation, Devils Gate Limestone
- Overlies: Roberts Mountains Formation
- Thickness: 1,570 feet (480 m)

Lithology
- Primary: dolomite

Location
- Region: Nevada
- Country: United States

The Lone Mountain Dolomite is a dolomite geologic formation in Nevada.

It preserves fossils dating back to the Silurian period.

== See also ==
- Lone Mountain Formation — Silurian Utah
- List of fossiliferous stratigraphic units in Nevada
- Paleontology in Nevada
