= Split Creek Formation =

Geological formation in Alaska

- Stratigraphic range: Paleogene
- Type: Formation

Location
- Region: Alaska
- Country: United States

The Split Creek Formation is a geologic formation in Alaska. It preserves fossils dating back to the Paleogene period.

== See also ==
- List of fossiliferous stratigraphic units in Alaska
- Paleontology in Alaska
