= Etivluk Group =

Geologic group in Alaska

- Stratigraphic range: Permian
- Type: Group

Location
- Region: Alaska
- Country: United States

The Etivluk Group is a geologic group in Alaska. It preserves fossils dating back to the Permian period.

== See also ==
- List of fossiliferous stratigraphic units in Alaska
- Paleontology in Alaska
