= Chapin Peak Formation =

Geologic formation in Alaska

Coordinates: 55°12′1″N 131°47′36″W

- Stratigraphic range: Triassic
- Type: Formation

Location
- Region: Alaska
- Country: United States

The Chapin Peak Formation is a geologic formation in Alaska. It preserves fossils dating back to the Triassic period.

== See also ==
- List of fossiliferous stratigraphic units in Alaska
- Paleontology in Alaska
