= Naknek Formation =

Geologic formation in Alaska, United States

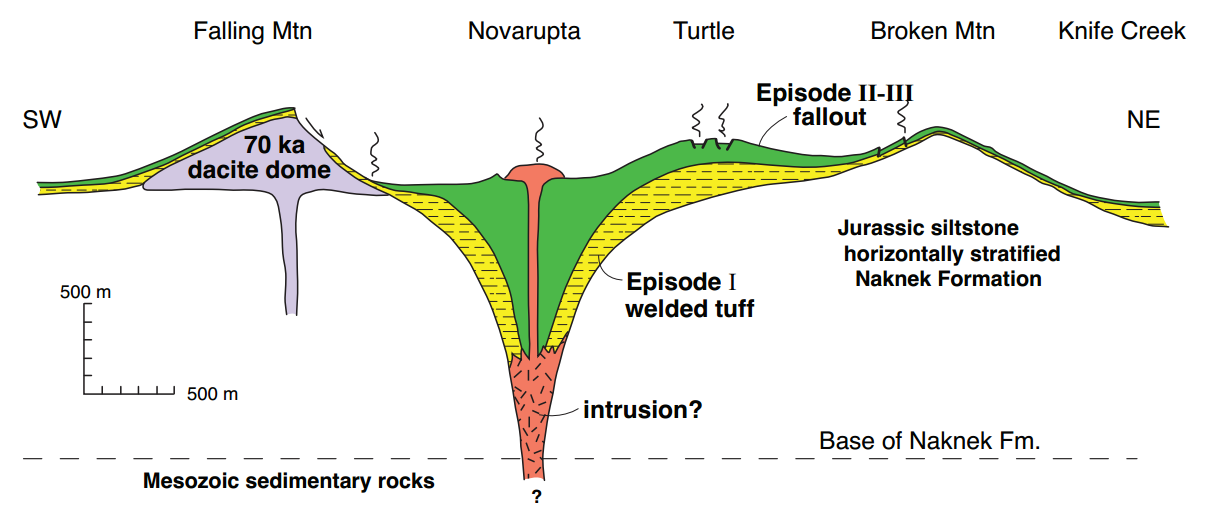
- Naknek Formation under Novarupta, Katmai National Park, Alaska
- Type: Geological formation

The Naknek Formation is a Mesozoic geological formation. Plesiosaur remains are among the fossils that have been recovered from its strata.

== See also ==
- Plesiosaur stratigraphic distribution
- Valley of Ten Thousand Smokes
