= Lisburne Group =

Geologic group in Alaska

- Stratigraphic range: Carboniferous
- Type: Group

Location
- Region: Alaska
- Country: United States

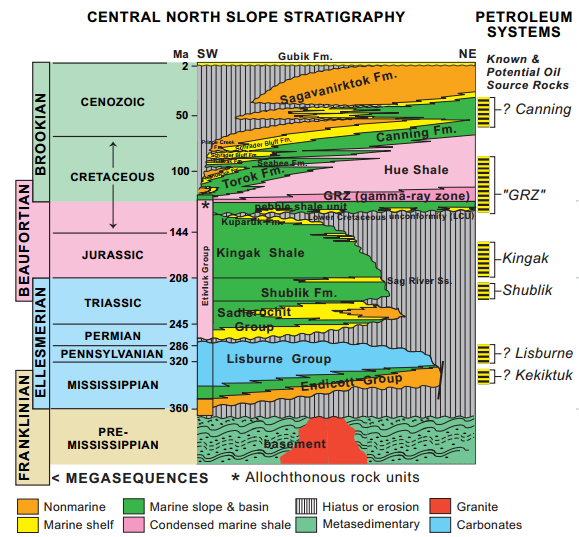
Central North Slope stratigraphy incl. Lisburne Group

The Lisburne Group is a geologic group in Alaska. It preserves fossils dating back to the Carboniferous period.

== See also ==
- List of fossiliferous stratigraphic units in Alaska
- Paleontology in Alaska
