= Sadlerochit Group =

Geologic group in Alaska

- Stratigraphic range: Permian
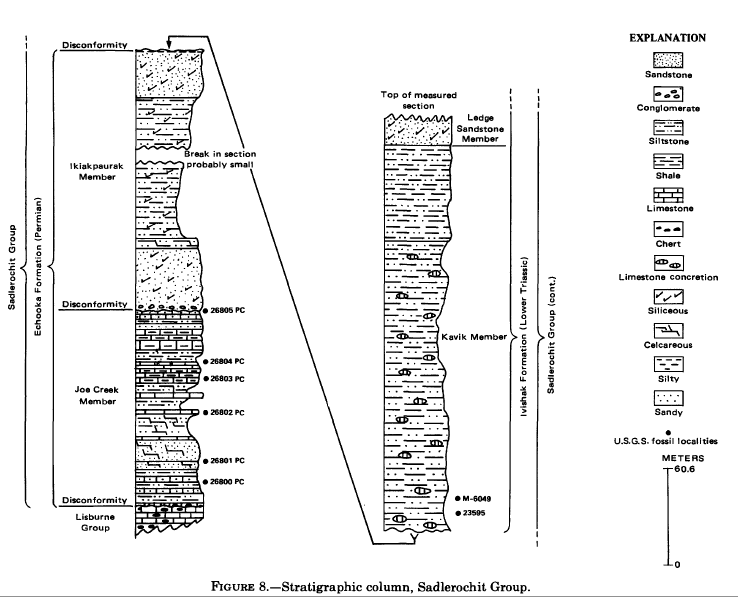
- Sadlerochit Group, geologic column
- Type: Formation

Location
- Region: Alaska
- Country: United States

The Sadlerochit Group (formerly the Sadlerochit Formation) is a geologic group in Alaska. It is the main source of oil and gas for the Prudhoe Bay Oil Field. It preserves fossils dating back to the Permian period.

== See also ==
- List of fossiliferous stratigraphic units in Alaska
- Paleontology in Alaska
