= Lone Mountain Formation =

Geologic formation in Nevada, United States

- Stratigraphic range: Silurian
- Type: Geologic formation
- Unit of: Great Basin carbonate platform sequence
- Underlies: Devonian carbonate units (regional)
- Overlies: Roberts Mountains Formation (regional)

Lithology
- Primary: Dolostone (dolomite)
- Other: Limestone (protolith)

Location
- Region: Central Nevada
- Country: United States
- Extent: Great Basin, Nevada

Type section
- Named for: Lone Mountain, Nevada
- Named by: Charles W. Merriam
- Year defined: 1973

The Lone Mountain Formation is a Silurian geologic formation in central Nevada. It consists mainly of thick-bedded dolostone that was originally deposited as shallow marine limestone and later altered through dolomitization. The formation is associated with a transition from deeper-water Silurian deposits below to Devonian carbonate units above. This makes it an important reference unit for understanding changes in sea level, sedimentation, and marine environments in the Great Basin during the late Paleozoic.

While the unit forms part of a broader carbonate platform system in the Great Basin, it is significant for reconstructing Silurian paleogeography in Nevada, as it records the development of a shallow, warm, marine shelf along the margin of a larger carbonate basin. Fossils preserved within the dolomite include brachiopods and corals, which help establish its age and support regional correlations with other Silurian rock units.

== See also ==
- Lone Mountain Dolomite — Silurian formation in Nevada
- List of fossiliferous stratigraphic units in Nevada
- Paleontology in Nevada
