= Colville Group =

Geologic formation in Alaska, United States

- Stratigraphic range: Paleogene
- Type: Group

Location
- Region: Alaska
- Country: United States

The Colville Group is a geologic group in Alaska. It preserves fossils dating back to the Paleogene period.

== See also ==
- List of fossiliferous stratigraphic units in Alaska
- Paleontology in Alaska
