= Parataxodium =

Parataxodium Temporal range: Late Jurassic –Paleogene

Scientific classification
- Kingdom: Plantae
- Clade: Tracheophytes
- Clade: Gymnospermae
- Division: Pinophyta
- Class: Pinopsida
- Order: Cupressales
- Family: Cupressaceae
- Subfamily: Taxodioideae
- Genus: †Parataxodium; Arnold and Lowther

Genus of ancient conifer

Parataxodium is an extinct genus of conifer that belonged to the subfamily Taxodioideae, a group included within cypress family. It is known primarily from fossilized remains dated to the Late Cretaceous period and is considered morphologically intermediate between modern genera such as Taxodium (bald cypress) and Metasequoia (dawn redwood). One species is known, Parataxodium wigginsii. Although it belongs to the swamp cypress family, it inhabited a much wider range of environments, including the cooler regions of Alaska. Although most fossils come from the Cretaceous, specimens are also known from both the Jurassic and the Paleogene.

== Distribution ==
Fossils are known from China, Canada and the United States (such as in Alaska, North Dakota and Montana).
