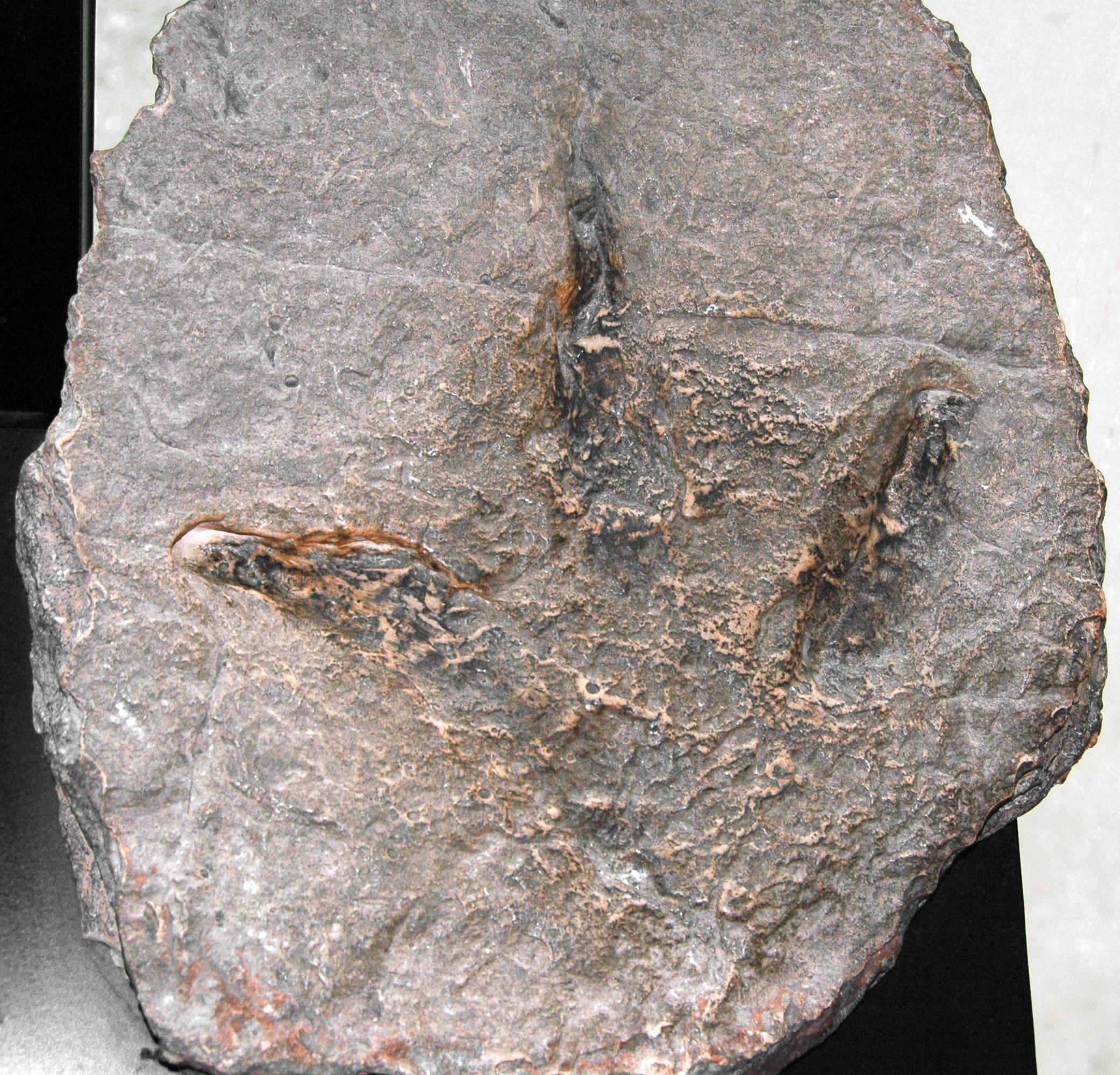
- Specimen from Dinosaur Ridge, Colorado

Trace fossil classification
- Kingdom: Animalia
- Phylum: Chordata
- Class: Reptilia
- Clade: Dinosauria
- Clade: Saurischia
- Clade: Theropoda
- Clade: †Ornithomimosauria
- Ichnofamily: †Ornithomimipodidae
- Ichnogenus: †Magnoavipes; Lee, 1997

= Magnoavipes =

Dinosaur footprint

Magnoavipes is an ichnogenus of dinosaur footprint.

A 2026 study found the type ichnospecies to be a nomem dubium due to its naming being based on penetrative tracks.

== See also ==
- List of dinosaur ichnogenera
