= Chamaecyparis eureka =

Chamaecyparis eureka Temporal range: Late Lutetian

Scientific classification
- Kingdom: Plantae
- Clade: Tracheophytes
- Clade: Gymnospermae
- Division: Pinophyta
- Class: Pinopsida
- Order: Cupressales
- Family: Cupressaceae
- Genus: Chamaecyparis
- Species: C. eureka

Binomial name
- Chamaecyparis eureka Kotyk, Basinger & McIver, 2003

Extinct species of conifer

Chamaecyparis eureka is an extinct species of conifer in the family Cupressaceae. It is known from fossil foliage found in the Buchanan Lake Formation deposits, dated to the middle Eocene Lutetian stage (48 to 41 million years ago), from western Axel Heiberg Island, located in the Arctic Ocean in the Qikiqtaaluk Region, Nunavut, Canada. C. eureka is the oldest confirmed member of the genus Chamaecyparis, which includes five to six living species, depending on circumscription, which are native to Eastern Asia, Japan, and North America.

Description of the new species by M. E. A. Kotyk, James Basinger, and Elisabeth McIver was based on the study of more than 850 twigs and 650 seed cone specimens; the holotype specimen, number "USPC-6357", and the five paratypes are housed in the University of Saskatchewan Paleobotanical Collection, Saskatoon, Saskatchewan, Canada. They published their 2003 type description of the species in the Canadian Journal of Botany volume number 81. and named the species eureka to reflect the type locality placement in the Eureka Sound group, Axel Heiberg Island.

Chamaecyparis eureka has been placed in the genus Chamaecyparis, based on the morphology of the seed cones, which differ significantly in the important characters from cone of related genera Cupressus and Fokienia. The general structure is that of a woody cone borne on the tip of a leafy branch; the cones are elongated to globose in overall shape. The cone scales bear between three and five winged seeds. C. eureka is most similar in character to the extant Japanese species Chamaecyparis pisifera and to a lesser extent to the western North American C. lawsoniana. The seed cones of C. eureka tend to be intermediate between the ranges normal for C. pisifera, which are smaller, and C. lawsoniana, which are larger. While the seed body and number of resin tubercles in C. eureka's winged seeds are most similar to those of C. pisifera, no seed specimens have yet to be recovered with intact wings, so a more in-depth comparison to living species was not possible.
