= Margaret Formation =

Geologic formation in Canada

- Stratigraphic range: Wasatchian; 54.3–50.7 Ma
- Type: Formation
- Unit of: Eureka Sound Group
- Overlies: Mount Moore Formation
- Thickness: 140 m (460 ft)

Lithology
- Primary: Sandstone
- Other: Siltstone, coal, tuff

Location
- Coordinates: 78.7°N 81.9°W
- Approximate paleocoordinates: 76.1°N 30.7°W
- Region: Ellesmere Island, Northwest Territories, Nunavut
- Country: Canada
- Extent: Sverdrup Basin
- Margaret Formation (Canada) Margaret Formation (Nunavut)

The Margaret Formation is a geologic formation of the Eureka Sound Group in the Sverdrup Basin in Northwest Territories and Nunavut, Canada. The unit belonging to the Eureka Sound Group which crops out at Ellesmere Island preserves fossils dating back to the Early Eocene period, or Wasatchian in the NALMA classification.

The Margaret Formation comprises sandstones, sandy siltstones, clay-rich sandstones, coal seams and clay-rich coal seams and volcanic ash beds. The thickness of the formation, which overlies the Mount Moore Formation, reaches about 140 metres (460 ft). Radiometric dating of the formation provided ages of 52.6 ± 1.9 Ma (2010) and 53.7 ± 0.6 Ma (2017).

The area where the formation was deposited in the Early Eocene experienced a much warmer climate than the High Arctic today, with mean annual temperatures ranging from 7.6 to 12.9 °C (45.7 to 55.2 °F) and warmest month mean temperatures from 18.2 to 22.2 °C (64.8 to 72.0 °F). The deltaic to swamp environment of the Margaret Formation has provided a diverse fauna of various groups of mammals, birds (Presbyornis and Gastornis), reptiles (turtles, snakes, lizards and crocodiles) and fish.

== Description ==
The Margaret Formation comprises sandstones, sandy siltstones, clay-rich sandstones, coal seams and clay-rich coal seams and volcanic ash beds. The thickness of the formation, which overlies the Mount Moore Formation, reaches about 140 metres (460 ft).

The formation was probably deposited in a lush proximal delta front to delta plain environment, with abundant channels and coal swamps.

=== Dating ===
A volcanic ash layer containing crandallite in the middle of the formation was dated using U-Pb radiometric dating in 2017 to 53.7 ± 0.6 Ma. In 2010, ashes of the formation were dated to 52.6 ± 1.9 Ma.

=== Arctic climate of the Early Eocene ===
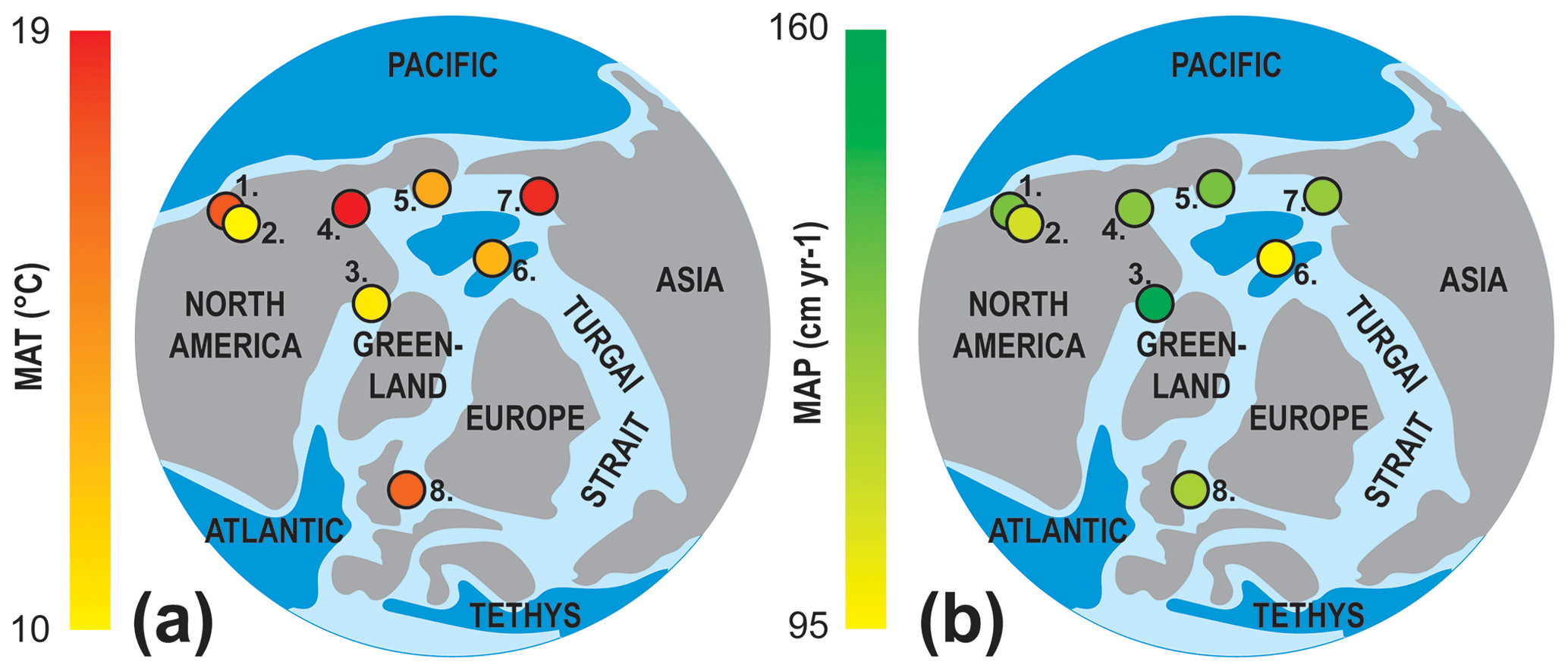
Early Eocene proxy ensemble data from fossil localities showing (a) MAT and (b) MAP estimates with the Margaret Formation indicated with (3)

During the Early Eocene, the climate of much of northern North America was warm and wet, with mean annual temperatures (MAT) as high as 20 °C (68 °F), mean annual precipitation (MAP) of 100 to 150 centimetres (39 to 59 in), mild frost-free winters (coldest month mean temperature >5 °C (41 °F)), and climatic conditions that supported extensive temperate forest ecosystems.

Ensemble estimates of mean annual temperatures for the high-latitude fossil localities in Arctic Canada ranged from 7.6 to 12.9 °C (45.7 to 55.2 °F), with the range of coldest month mean temperature from 1.3 to 4.2 °C (34.3 to 39.6 °F) and warmest month mean temperatures from 18.2 to 22.2 °C (64.8 to 72.0 °F). Mean annual precipitation estimates for the Margaret Formation ranged between 131 and 180 centimetres (52 and 71 in). The mean summer precipitation has been estimated at 1,134 millimetres (44.6 in) and mean winter precipitation at 366 millimetres (14.4 in).

The fossils and sedimentology indicate a lush, rain forest community on a coastal delta plain. Multiple palaeoclimate proxies, ranging from oxygen isotope analysis of vertebrate bones and teeth to palaeofloral analyses, estimate a mild temperate climate for the Eocene High Arctic, where winters remained at or just above freezing and summer temperatures extended to 20 °C (68 °F) or higher. These temperatures are a far cry from today's High Arctic, where central Ellesmere Island experiences a mean annual temperature of −19 °C (−2 °F), a warm month mean temperature of about 6 °C (43 °F) and a cold month mean temperature of −38 °C (−36 °F) or colder.

Despite the mild Eocene Arctic climate, the vertebrate fauna would have experienced months of total darkness and cooler temperatures during the winter. Recent isotopic work suggests that some mammals, including the hippo-like Coryphodon, were year-round residents in the High Arctic. Given that Gastornis was large (approaching 2 metres (6.6 ft)) and flightless, it likely also was a year-round resident of the Arctic. In contrast, the volant Presbyornis might have been a seasonal migrant to the Arctic.

== Fossil content ==
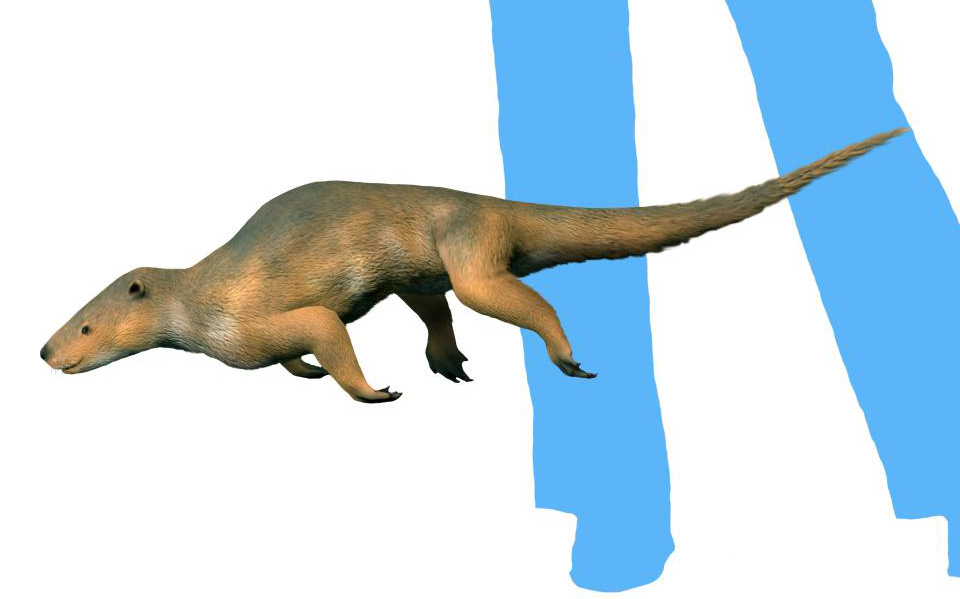
Palaeosinopa

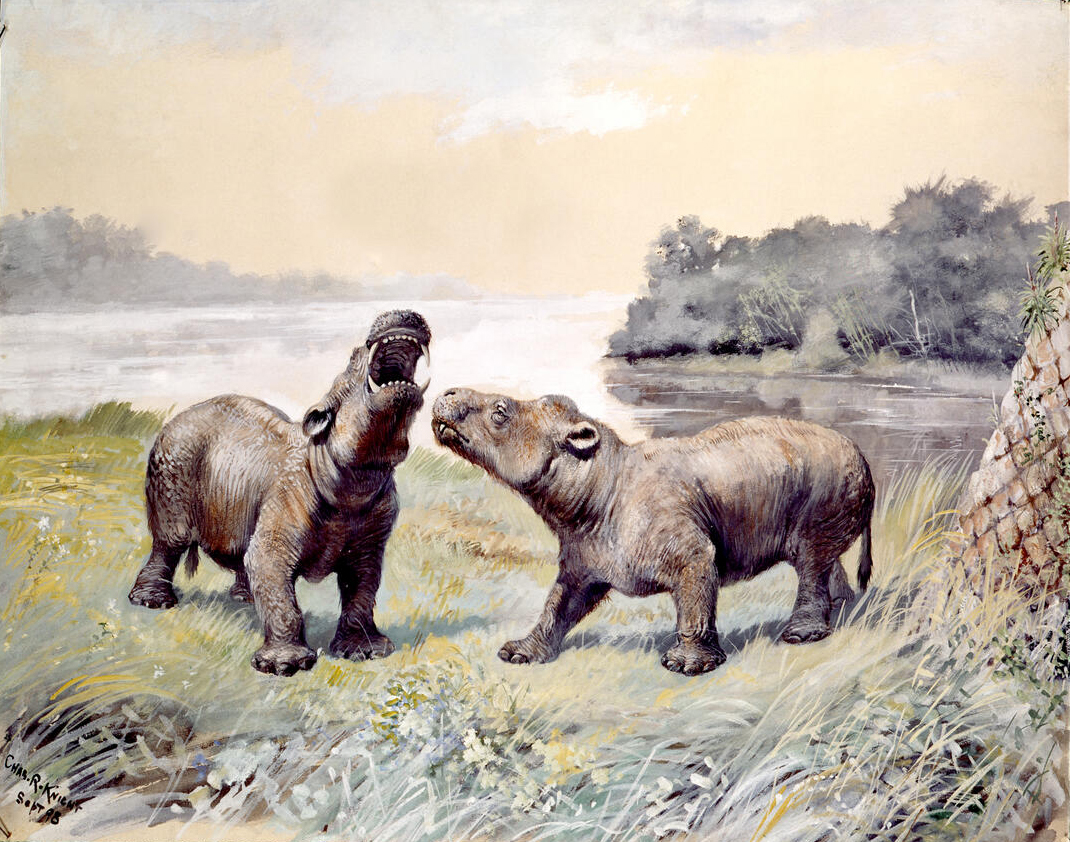
Coryphodon

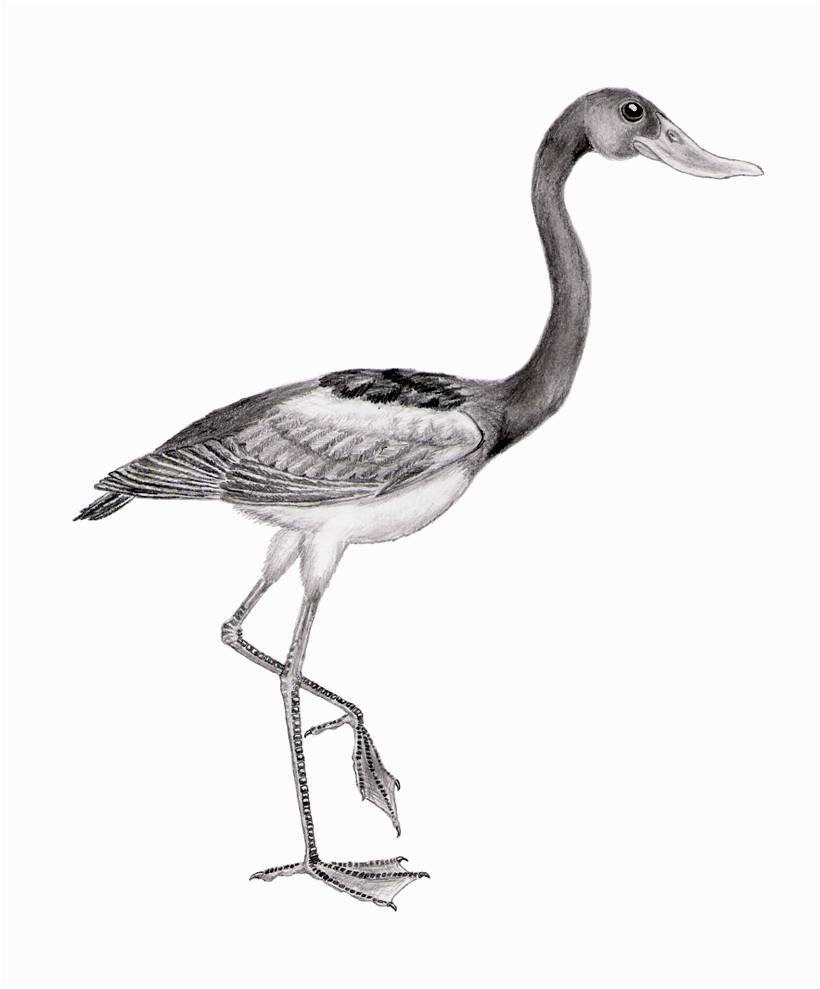
Presbyornis

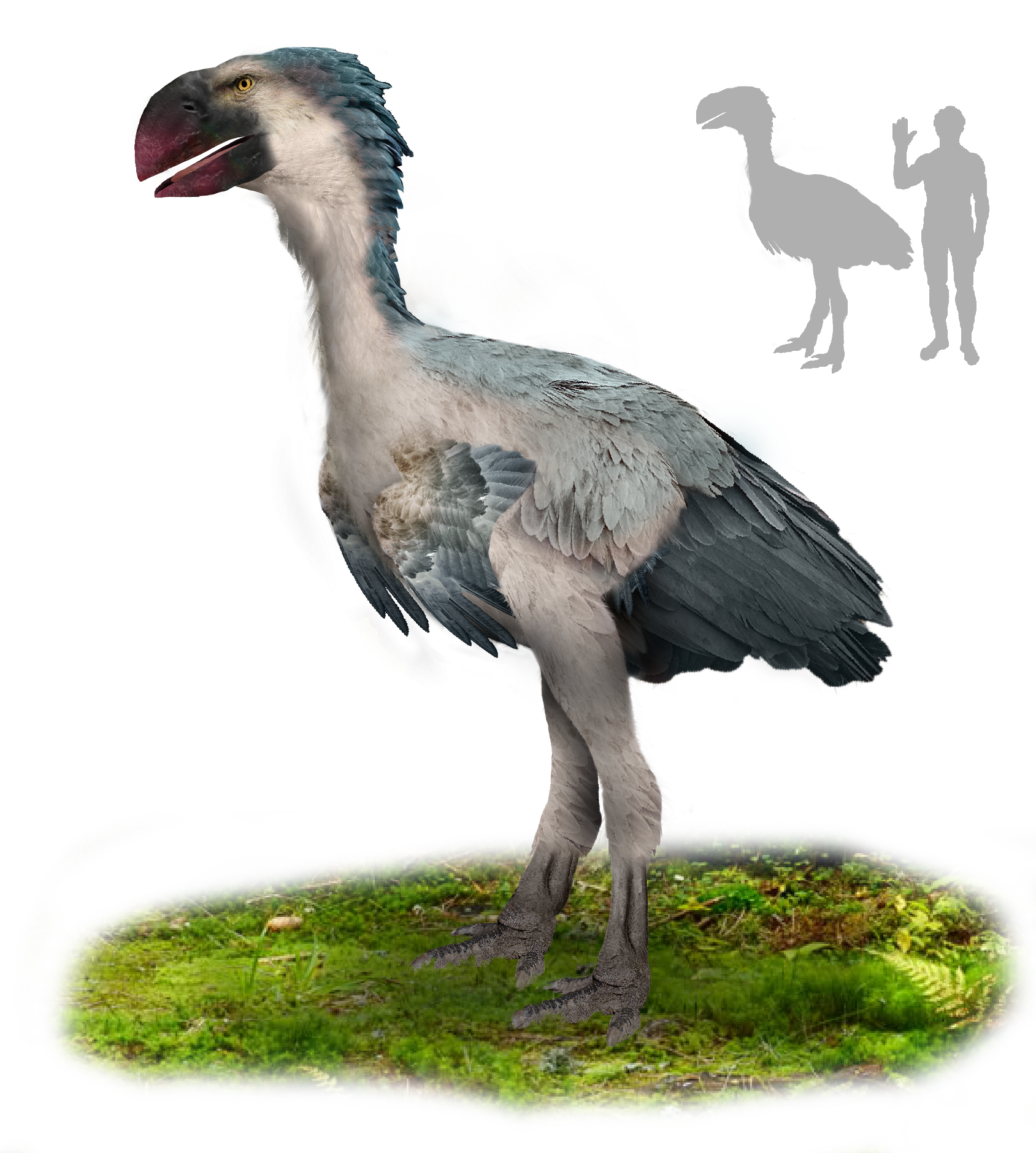
Gastornis

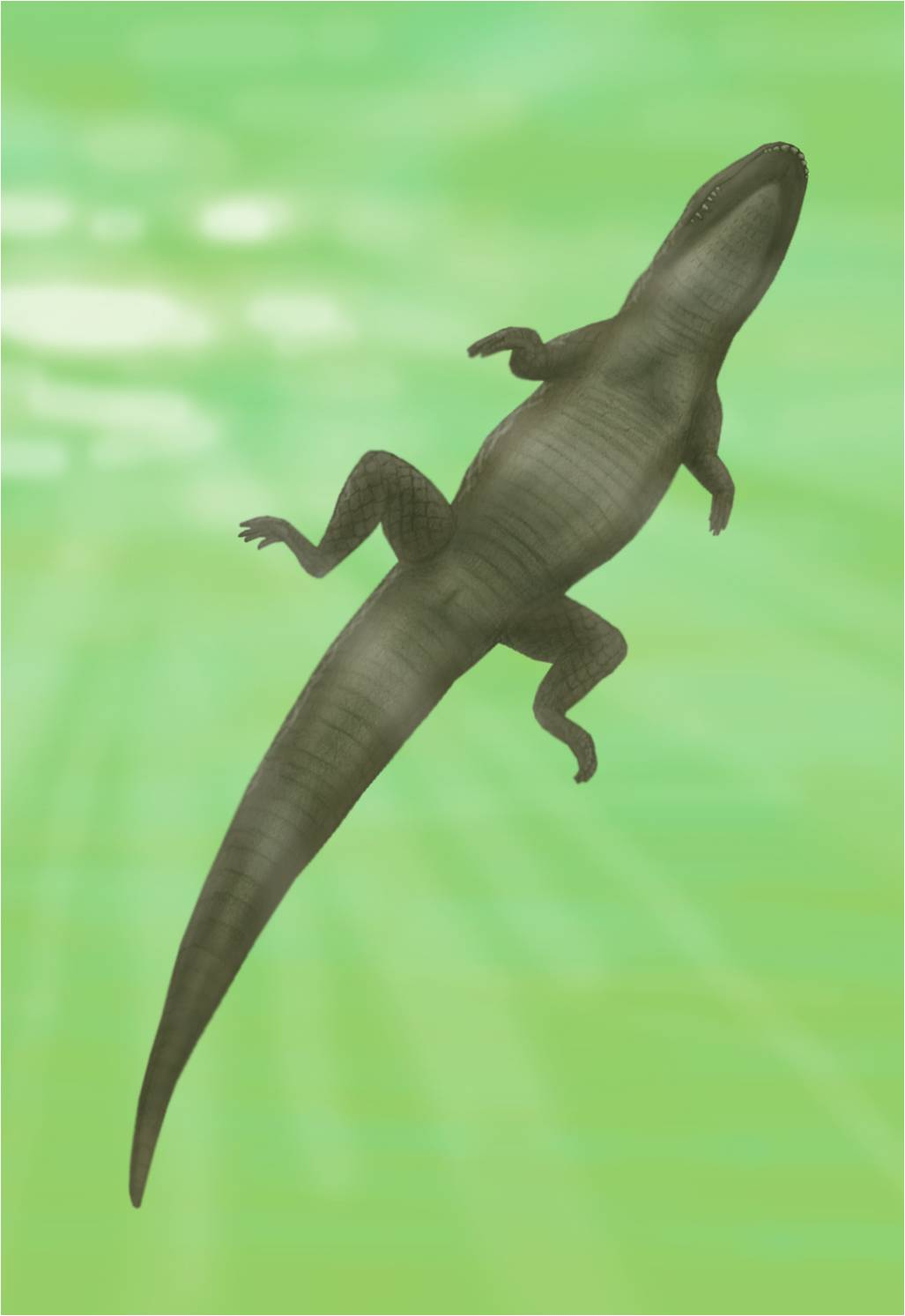
Allognathosuchus

The formation has provided the following fossils:

=== Mammals ===
Primates

- Paromomyidae indet.

Acreodi

- Pachyaena sp.

Carnivora

- Miacis sp.
- cf. Vulpavus sp.

Dermoptera

- Plagiomene sp.

Eutheria

- Palaeosinopa nunavutensis
- Anacodon sp.

Ferae

- Arcticanodon dawsonae
- Palaeonictis sp.
- Viverravus sp.

Glires

- Microparamys bayi
- Paramys hunti
- Strathcona major
- S. minor
- ?Paramyinae indet.

Hyaenodonta

- Prolimnocyon sp.

Leptictida

- Prodiacodon sp.

Multituberculata

- Ectypodus arctos
- Neoplagiaulacidae indet.

Pantodonta

- Coryphodon pisuqti

Perissodactyla

- Lambdotherium sp.
- Thuliadanta mayri
- Equidae indet.

=== Birds ===
Anseriformes

- Presbyornis cf. pervetus

Gastornithiformes

- Gastornis sp.

=== Reptiles ===
Turtles

- Geochelone sp.
- Cryptodira indet.
- Emydinae indet.
- Kinosterninae indet.
- Trionychidae indet.

Crocodiles

- Allognathosuchus sp.

Lizards

- Anguidae indet.
- Varanidae indet.

Snakes

- Erycidae indet.

=== Amphibians ===
Caudata

- Piceoerpeton willwoodense

=== Fish ===
Teleostei

- Esox sp.

Amiiformes

- Amia fragosa
- Amia cf. uintaensis

Lepisosteiformes

- ?Lepisosteus sp.

== Correlations ==
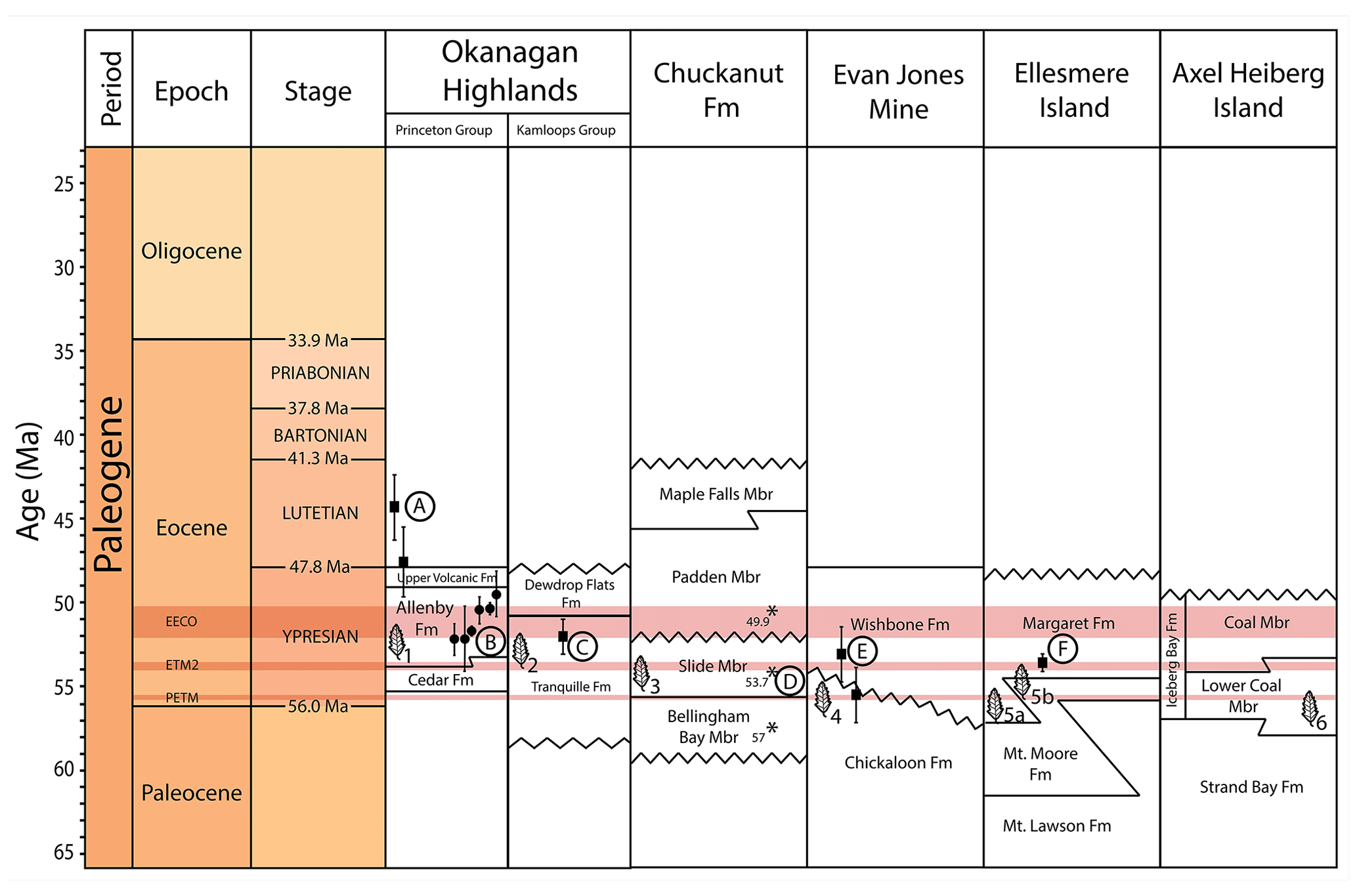
Correlation of the Margaret Formation with other Early Eocene formations in northern North America

The formation has been correlated with the Allenby Formation and Kamloops Group of British Columbia, the Chickaloon Formation of Alaska, and with the Wishbone, Chuckanut and Iceberg Bay Formations. The upper Margaret Formation also has been correlated with the Buchanan Lake Formation of the Eastern Arctic Archipelago.

Wasatchian correlations in North America
| Formation | Wasatch | DeBeque | Claron | Indian Meadows | Pass Peak | Tatman | Willwood | Golden Valley | Coldwater | Allenby | Kamloops | Ootsa Lake | Margaret | Nanjemoy | Hatchetigbee | Tetas de Cabra | Hannold Hill | Coalmont | Cuchara | Galisteo | San Jose | Ypresian (IUCS) • Itaboraian (SALMA) Bumbanian (ALMA) • Mangaorapan (NZ) |
| Basin | Powder River Uinta Piceance Colorado Plateau Wind River Green River Bighorn | Piceance | Colorado Plateau | Wind River | Green River | Bighorn | | Williston | Okanagan | Princeton | Buck Creek | Nechako | Sverdrup | Potomac | GoM | Laguna Salada | Rio Grande | North Park | Raton | Galisteo | San Juan | Margaret Formation (North America) |
| Country | United States | | | | | | | | Canada | | | | | United States | | Mexico | United States | | | | | Margaret Formation (North America) |
|---|---|---|---|---|---|---|---|---|---|---|---|---|---|---|---|---|---|---|---|---|---|---|
| Copelemur | | | | | | | | | | | | | | | | | | | | | | Margaret Formation (North America) |
| Coryphodon | | | | | | | | | | | | | | | | | | | | | | Margaret Formation (North America) |
| Diacodexis | | | | | | | | | | | | | | | | | | | | | | Margaret Formation (North America) |
| Homogalax | | | | | | | | | | | | | | | | | | | | | | Margaret Formation (North America) |
| Oxyaena | | | | | | | | | | | | | | | | | | | | | | Margaret Formation (North America) |
| Paramys | | | | | | | | | | | | | | | | | | | | | | Margaret Formation (North America) |
| Primates | | | | | | | | | | | | | | | | | | | | | | Margaret Formation (North America) |
| Birds | | | | | | | | | | | | | | | | | | | | | | Margaret Formation (North America) |
| Reptiles | | | | | | | | | | | | | | | | | | | | | | Margaret Formation (North America) |
| Fish | | | | | | | | | | | | | | | | | | | | | | Margaret Formation (North America) |
| Insects | | | | | | | | | | | | | | | | | | | | | | Margaret Formation (North America) |
| Flora | | | | | | | | | | | | | | | | | | | | | | Margaret Formation (North America) |
| Environments | Alluvial-fluvio-lacustrine | Fluvial | | | | Fluvial | Fluvio-lacustrine | Fluvial | Lacustrine | | Fluvio-lacustrine | | Deltaic-paludal | Shallow marine | | Fluvial | Shallow marine | Fluvial | | Fluvial | | Wasatchian volcanoclastics Wasatchian fauna Wasatchian flora |
| Volcanic | Yes | No | | | | | | | Yes | No | Yes | No | Yes | No | | | | | | Yes | No | Wasatchian volcanoclastics Wasatchian fauna Wasatchian flora |

== See also ==
- List of fossiliferous stratigraphic units in Northwest Territories
- List of fossiliferous stratigraphic units in Nunavut
