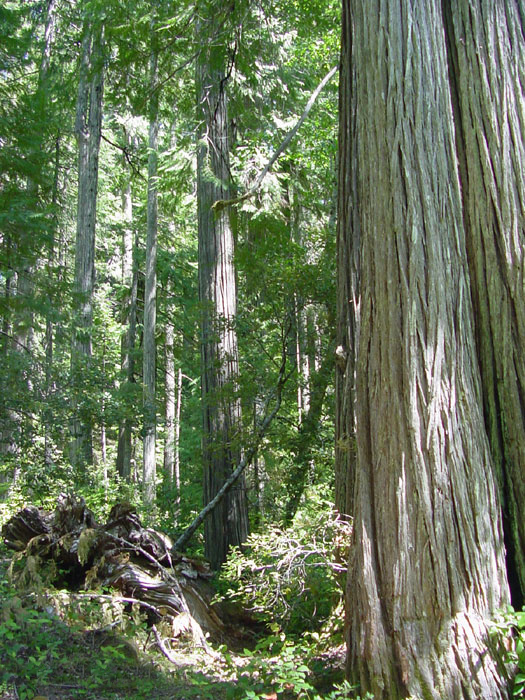
- Old-growth stand of C. lawsoniana in California

Conservation status
- Near Threatened (IUCN 3.1)

Scientific classification
- Kingdom: Plantae
- Clade: Tracheophytes
- Clade: Gymnospermae
- Division: Pinophyta
- Class: Pinopsida
- Order: Cupressales
- Family: Cupressaceae
- Genus: Chamaecyparis
- Species: C. lawsoniana

Binomial name
- Chamaecyparis lawsoniana (A.Murray bis) Parl.
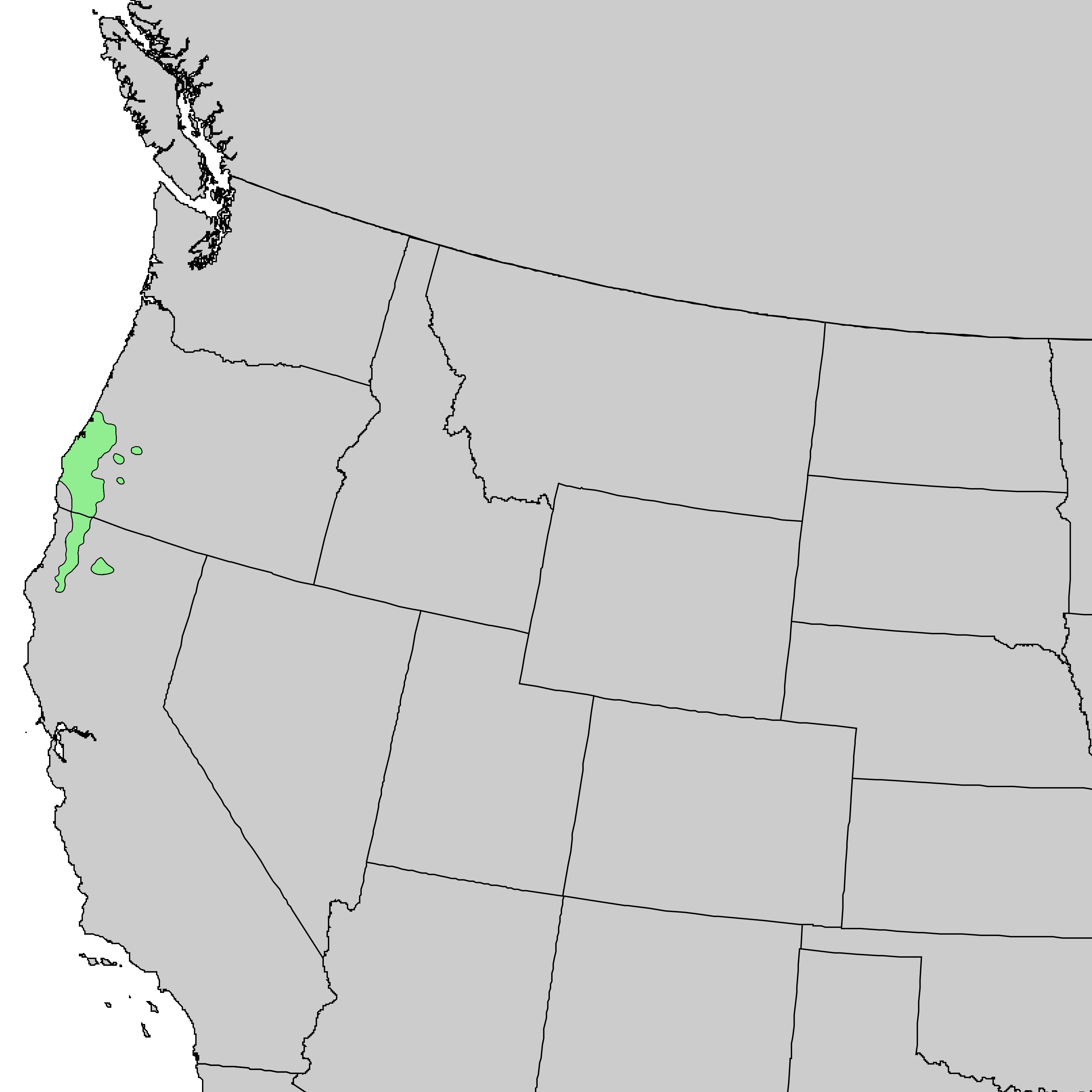
- Natural range of Port Orford cedar

= Chamaecyparis lawsoniana =

Species of conifer

Chamaecyparis lawsoniana, known as Port Orford cedar or Lawson's cypress, is a species of conifer in the genus Chamaecyparis, family Cupressaceae. It is native to Oregon and northwestern California, and grows from sea level up to 1,500 metres (4,900 ft) in the valleys of the Klamath Mountains, often along streams.

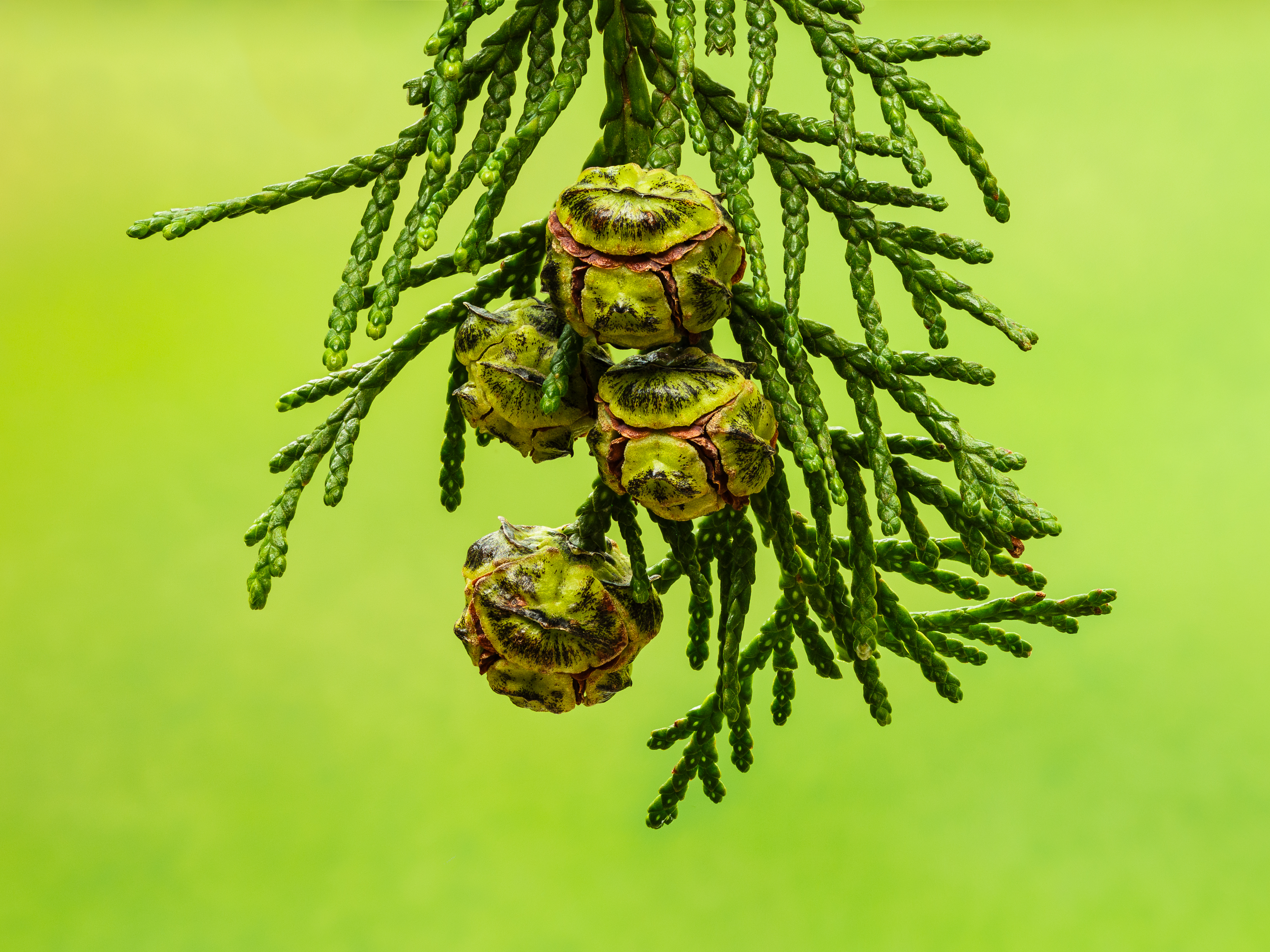
Cypress cones of a Chamaecyparis lawsoniana.

== Description ==
A large evergreen tree, specimens mature up to 50 m (160 ft) tall or more (exceptionally to 81 m (266 ft)), with trunks 1.2–2 m (4–7 ft) in diameter, exceptionally 3.65 m (12.0 ft). The bark is silver-brown, vertically furrowed, and 15–25 centimetres (6–10 in) thick near the base. The foliage is arranged in lacy, flat sprays with a feathery appearance, usually somewhat glaucous (i.e. blue-green) in color. The leaves are scale-like, 3–5 millimetres (1/8–3/16 in) long, with narrow white markings on the underside, and produced on somewhat flattened shoots. The foliage gives off a rather pungent scent, not unlike parsley. The seed cones are globose, 7–14 millimetres (9/32–9/16 in) in diameter, with 6–10 scales, green at first, maturing brown in early fall, 6–8 months after pollination. The male cones are 3–4 millimetres (1/8–5/32 in) long, dark red, turning brown after pollen release in early spring. The seeds fall quickly and can float on water.

Old specimens lack branches near the base and often have dead tops. They can live up to about 600 years of age.

== Taxonomy ==
The species was first documented near Port Orford, Oregon, and introduced into cultivation in 1854 by collectors working for Charles Lawson FRSE of the Lawson & Son nursery in Edinburgh, Scotland, after whom it was named as Lawson's Cypress by the describing botanist Andrew Murray. The United States Department of Agriculture officially calls it by the name Port Orford cedar, as do most people in its native area, but some botanists prefer to use the name Lawson's cypress (or in very rare instances Port Orford cypress) instead. The name "Lawson's cypress" is widely used in horticulture.

== Distribution and habitat ==
The species is native to southwestern Oregon and northwestern California, and grows from sea level up to 1,500 metres (4,900 ft) in the valleys of the Klamath Mountains, often along streams. It fares best at the north end of its range.

== Ecology ==
The thick bark provides resistance to wildfires, and the species regenerates well on disrupted land in a variety of soils, but requires consistent moisture. It is shade tolerant, but not as much so as competing species western hemlock and white fir. The old-growth population near Coos Bay, Oregon, was wiped out by logging and wildfires in 1867–1868, and again by fire and root disease in 1936.

=== Disease ===
In the wild, the species is seriously and uniquely threatened by a root disease caused by the oomycete pathogen, Phytophthora lateralis, accidentally introduced in the early 1950s following the fungus's arrival to the Pacific Northwest on nursery trees. This disease is also a problem for horticultural plantings in some parts of North America. The tree is sometimes killed, though less often, by other species of Phytophthora.

Phytophthora lateralis infection begins when mycelium, from a germinated spore, invade the roots. The infection then spreads through the inner bark and cambium around the base of the tree. Spread up the trunk is generally limited. Infected tissue dies and effectively girdles the tree. Large trees are more likely to be infected than small trees due to larger root areas (although all trees at the edges of infected streams will eventually succumb). However, large trees can often live with the infections for a longer duration (up to several years).

C. lawsoniana in streamside populations are highly susceptible to P. lateralis infection. However, the rate of fungal spread through populations in dry upland areas appears to be slow. P. lateralis spreads through water via mobile spores (zoospores). The fungus also produces resting spores (chlamydospores) that can persist in soil for a long period of time. New infections generally begin when soil is transferred from an infected population to a non-infected population via water, human or animal movement. After initial infection in streamside populations, secondary spread via zoospores quickly infects all downstream individuals.

Human facilitated spread is thought to be responsible for most new, and all long-distance, infections. Soil on vehicle tires, especially logging trucks and other off-road vehicles, is considered the most pressing problem due to the volume of soil that can be carried and the traffic rate in and between susceptible areas. Spread on boots and mountain bike tires has also been suggested and probably contributes to new infections locally. Animal-facilitated spread is thought to occur, but is localized.

The United States Forest Service and Bureau of Land Management attempt to prevent Phytophthora spread through road closures, monitoring, research and education. Research has focused on determining the dynamics and mechanisms of spread, as well as attempts to breed resistant trees. One solution against Phytophtera is known generically as Mancozeb and also commercially known as Dithane (C). Commercial preparations of the parasitic fungus Pythium oligandrum are licensed for pest control, and documented to predate many species of Phytophthora.

=== Similar species ===
The extinct Eocene species Chamaecyparis eureka, known from fossils found on Axel Heiberg Island in Canada, is noted as resembling C. lawsoniana and C. pisifera.

The associated genus Calocedrus (incense-cedar) has thick orange-brown bark and the bark of Thuja plicata (western redcedar) is comparatively thin; both have different foliage than Port Orford cedar.

== Cultivation ==
Chamaecyparis lawsoniana thrives best in well-drained but moist soils, in a fairly sheltered position in full sun. Several hundred named cultivars of varying crown shape, growth rates and foliage color have been selected for planting in parks and gardens. In the United Kingdom (UK) the following have gained the Royal Horticultural Society's Award of Garden Merit (confirmed 2017):

Name	Height (m)	Spread (m)	Shape	Foliage Colour	Ref.
'Aurea Densa'	1.5	1.0	broadly conical	yellow-green	
'Chilworth Silver'	2.5	1.0	broadly columnar	silver-blue	
'Dik's Weeping'	12.0	4.0	columnar, weeping	blue-green	
'Ellwoodii'	8.0	4.0	columnar	grey-green	
'Ellwood's Gold'	4.0	1.0	columnar	yellow/grey-green	
'Ellwood's Pillar'	2.5	1.5	narrowly columnar	grey-green	
'Fletcheri'	12.0	4.0	columnar	grey-green	
'Gimbornii'	2.5	2.5	rounded	grey-green	
'Golden Wonder'	20.0	4.0	columnar	yellow-green	
'Grayswood Feather'	4.0	1.5	narrowly columnar	green	
'Green Globe'	0.3	0.3	rounded	dark green	
'Imbricata Pendula'	8.0	4.0	conical, weeping, pendulous	green	
'Kilmacurragh'	12.0	4.0	columnar	dark green	
'Lanei Aurea'	8.0	2.5	columnar	yellow-green	
'Little Spire'	2.5	1.5	conical	dark green	
'Minima Aurea'	1.0	1.0	conical	yellow-green	
'Minima Glauca'	2.5	2.5	rounded	blue-green	
'Pembury Blue'	12.00+	8.00	conical	blue-green	
'Pygmaea Argentea'	2.5	1.0	rounded	cream/blue-green	
'Stardust'	4.0	1.5	columnar	yellow-green	
'Summer Snow'	2.5	1.5	conical	cream/green	
'Triomf van Boskoop'	25.0	8.0	broadly columnar	grey-green	
'Wisselii'	12.0+	4.0	narrowly conical	blue-green	
'Wissel's Saguaro'	6.0	1.0	narrow, upright	blue-green	

== Uses ==
The species was discovered by Euro-Americans in the 1850s. The wood is light yet has great strength and rot resistance, even after long exposure to salt water. Its properties resemble those of yellow-cedar, but was historically more available in the region. On shores lacking docks, logs were transported via high-line cable directly onto ship decks. It was valued for boatbuilding. The species was important to Oregon's lumber industry until the 1950s when it was crippled by disease. It was preferred for storage battery cell separation, Venetian blinds, and other uses. Quality specimens eventually began to be shipped almost exclusively to East Asia, where it is highly valued. Large amounts have been exported to Japan where it is used in making coffins, shrines, and temples. Its lumber is known for its highly fragrant ginger aroma, caused by an oil which repulses decay and insects, including termites; this oil has been used as an insecticide. Due to the straightness of its grain, it is also one of the preferred woods for the manufacture of arrow shafts. It is also considered an acceptable, though not ideal, wood for construction of aircraft.

The wood is considered more than acceptable for use in stringed instruments. Its fine grain, good strength and tonal quality are highly regarded for soundboards in guitar making.

== Gallery ==
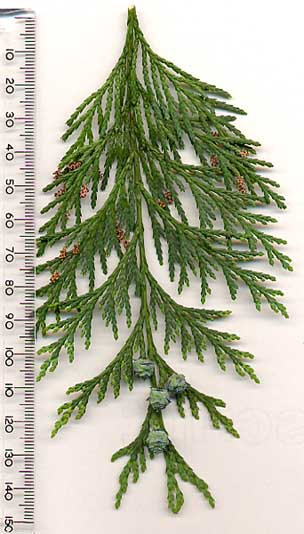
Foliage with cones: immature seed cones below, pollen cones above

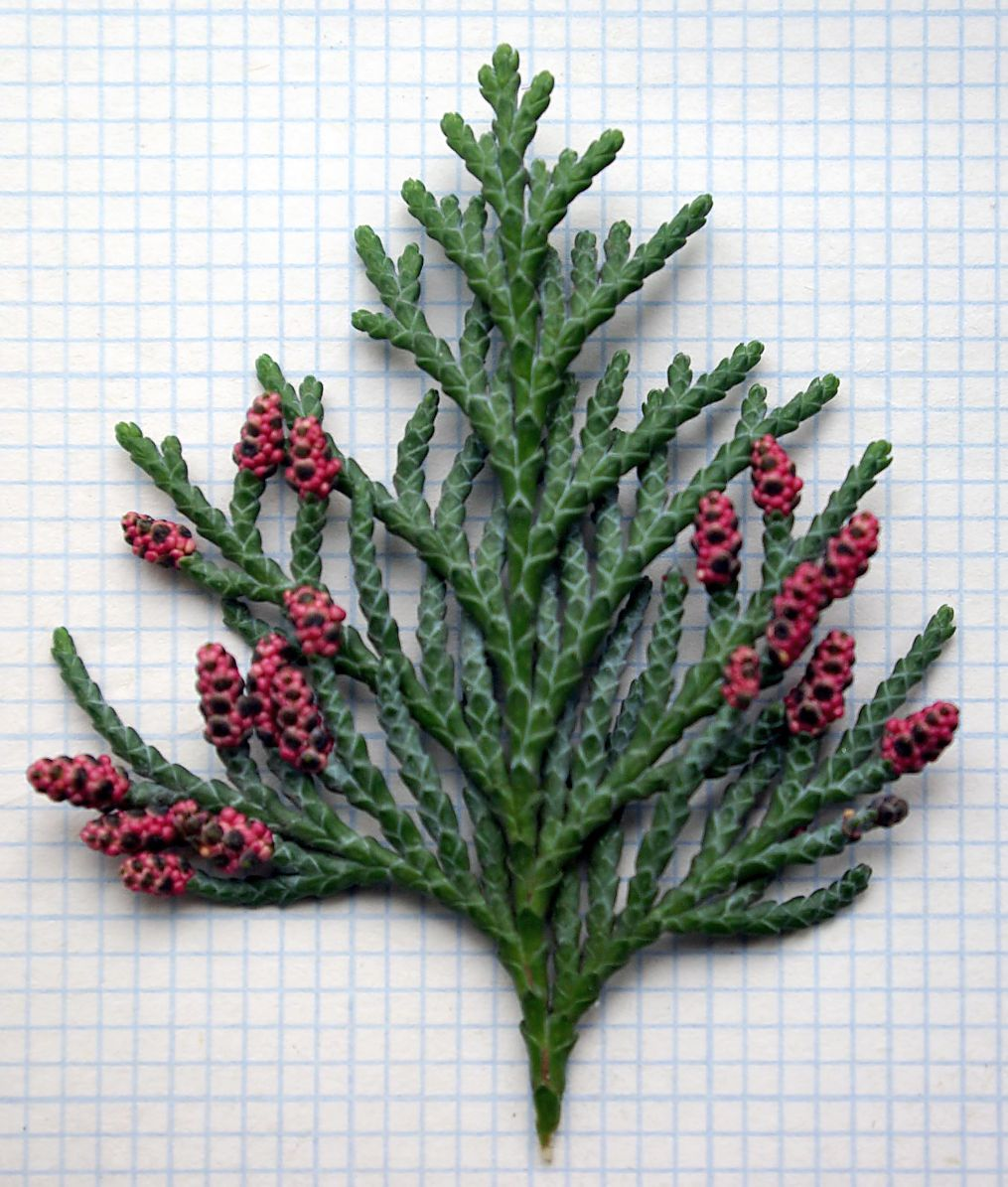
Male cones in spring with diagnostic red colour

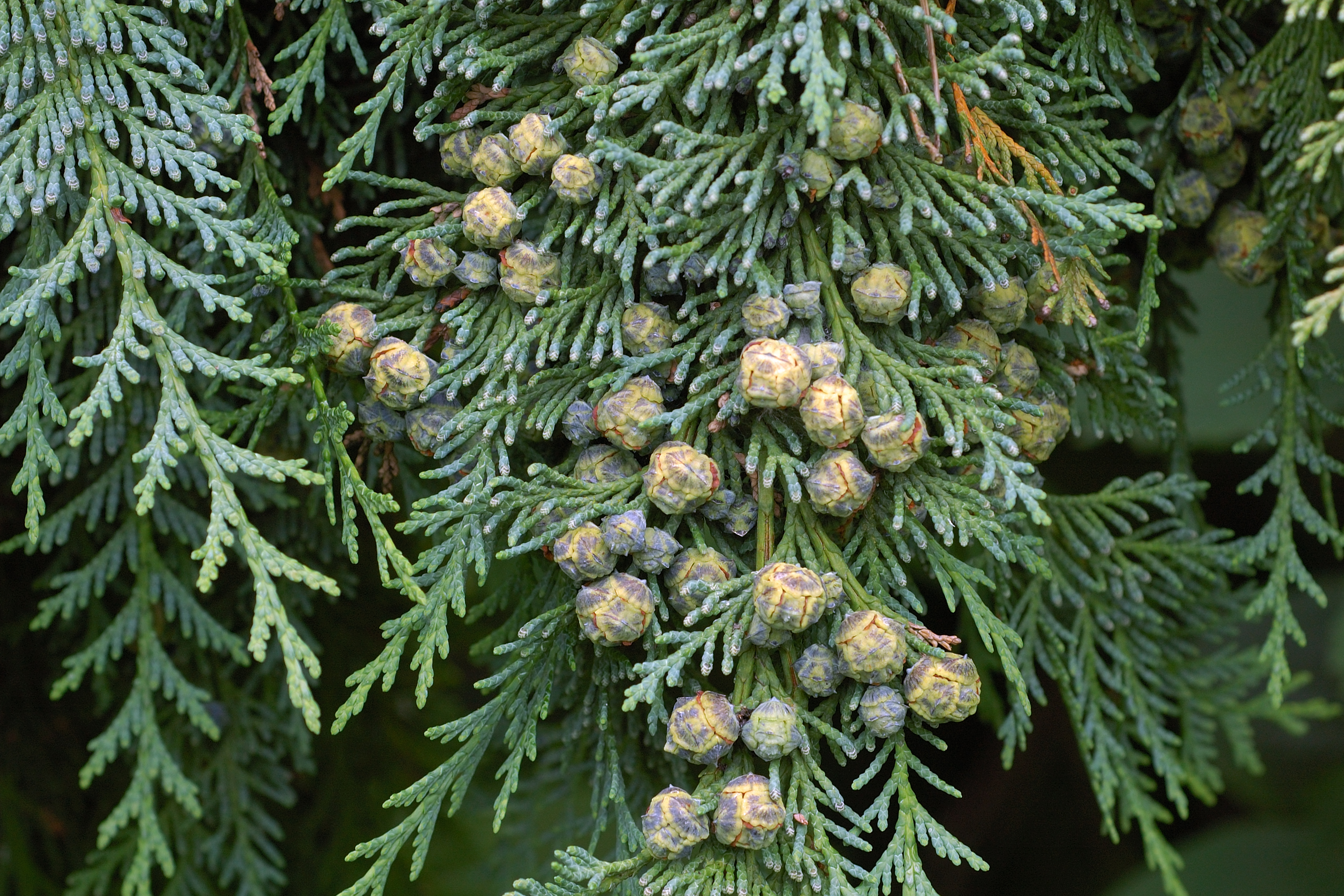
Mature female cones

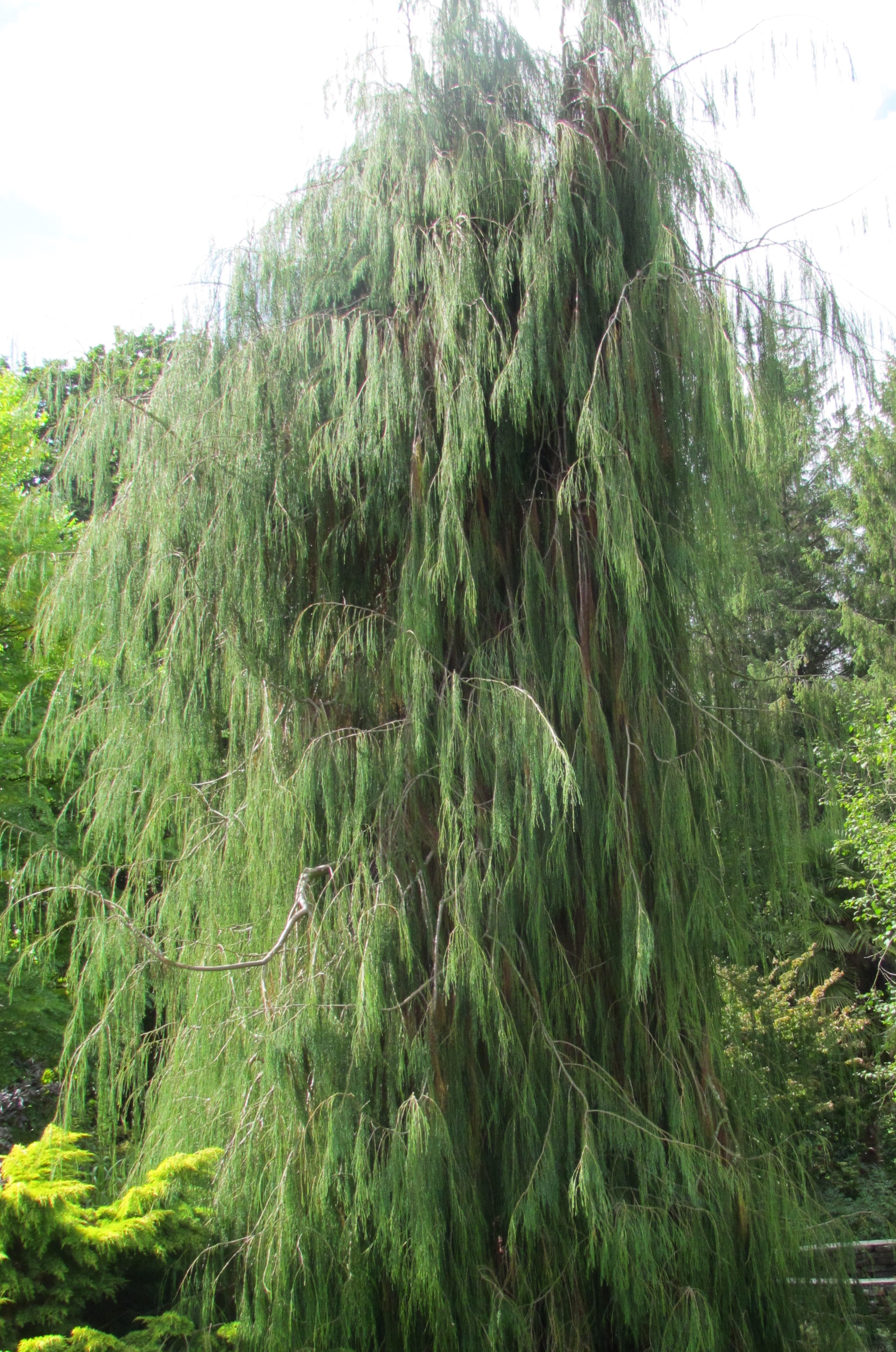
Cultivar 'Imbricata Pendula', Rosemoor, Devon, UK

== See also ==
- Cedar wood
