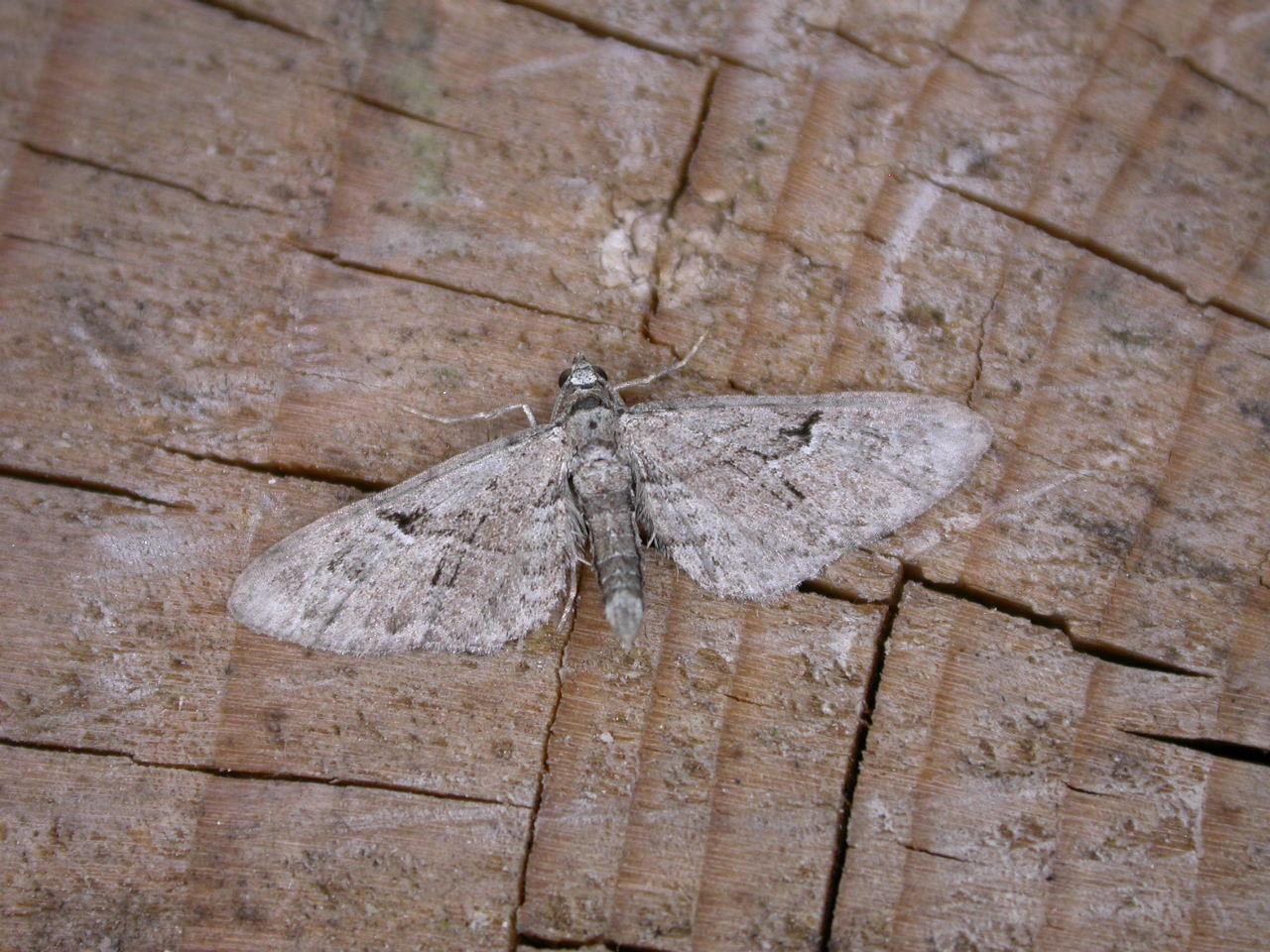

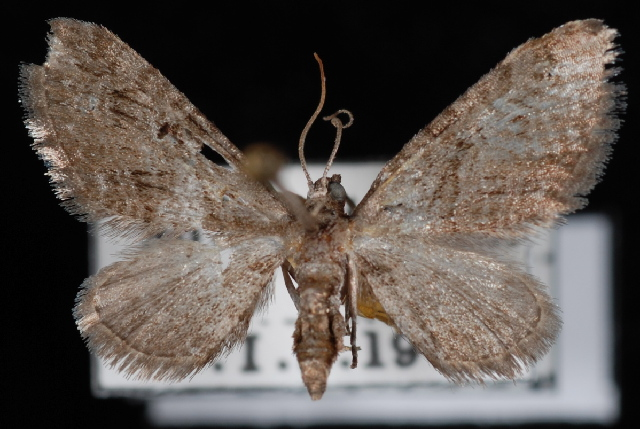

Scientific classification
- Kingdom: Animalia
- Phylum: Arthropoda
- Clade: Pancrustacea
- Class: Insecta
- Order: Lepidoptera
- Family: Geometridae
- Genus: Eupithecia
- Species: E. pusillata

Binomial name
- Eupithecia pusillata (Denis & Schiffermüller, 1775)

Synonyms
- Geometra pusillata Denis & Schiffermüller, 1775; Eupithecia quebecata Taylor, 1910; Eupithecia anglicata Herrich-Schäffer, 1863; Eupithecia expressaria Herrich-Schäffer, 1848; Eupithecia latoniata Milliere, 1882; Eupithecia scotica Dietze, 1910; Eupithecia sobrinaria Boisduval, 1840; Geometra sobrinata Hubner, 1817; Eupithecia stevensata Webb, 1896; Eupithecia masuii Inoue, 1980

= Juniper pug =

Species of moth

The juniper pug or juniper looper (Eupithecia pusillata) is a moth of the family Geometridae. The species was first described by Michael Denis and Ignaz Schiffermüller in 1775. It is found throughout the Palearctic (Ireland to the Russian Far East) and in the Nearctic.

Subspecies E. p. interruptofasciata is sometimes treated as a valid species Eupithecia interruptofasciata.

The forewings are greyish brown often with two distinctive black cross bands. The wingspan is 17–21 mm (0.67–0.83 in). It is relatively contrastingly coloured, with marked, light and dark cross-bands and short black longitudinal lines. It often lacks a black spot in the middle of the wing (discal spot). It is extremely variable but generally easy to recognize by the acutely angulated antemedian line, the whitish patch between discal dot and the postmedian and dark dashes proximally to the postmedian — graeseriata Ratzer (= latoniata Mill.) is larger and greyer is in general more weakly marked but very variable (Swiss Alps). — anglicata H-Sch. from the chalk cliffs of Kent, is a whitish grey form of rather characteristic appearance. — scoriata Stgr. from Iceland, is a dark, weakly-marked form.

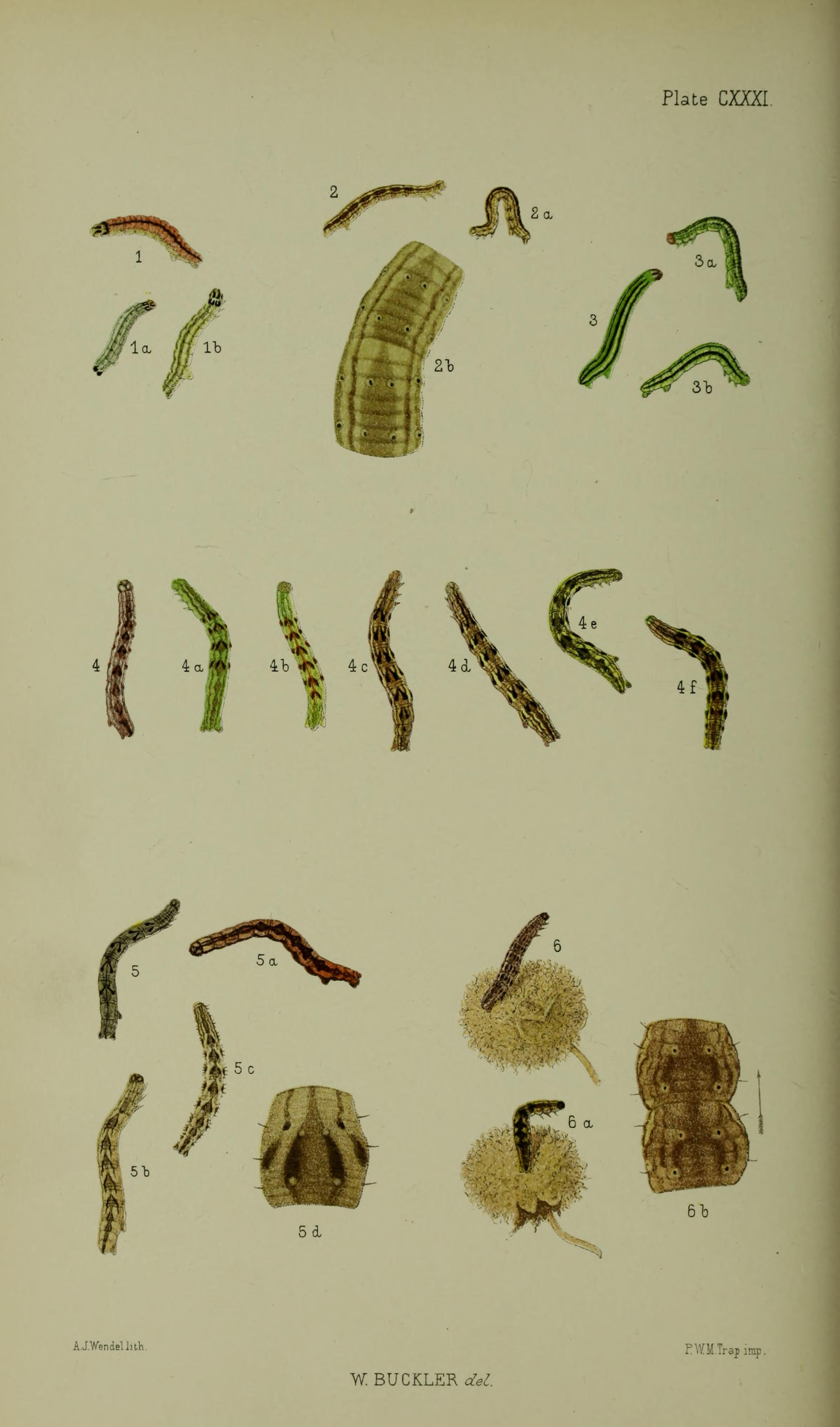
3,3a larvae after final moult

The larva has a number of short brushes and numerous small white warts. The body is green, along the back it has either a simple, dark back strip or a variety of bell-shaped, dark brown spots.

The adults fly at night from July to September, and are attracted to light.

In the Old World, the larva feeds on Juniperus (juniper) and some other conifers in the cypress family such as Chamaecyparis and Thuja. In the New World, there is a greater range of recorded food plants including apple, clover, raspberry, redcurrant, strawberry, sunflower and willow as well as juniper. The species overwinters as an egg.

== Subspecies ==
- Eupithecia pusillata pusillata
- Eupithecia pusillata interruptofasciata Packard, 1873 (eastern United States and Canada)
- Eupithecia pusillata kashmirica Mironov & Ratzel, 2008 (Pakistan)
- Eupithecia pusillata scoriata Staudinger, 1857

== Notes ==
- The flight season refers to the British Isles. This may vary in other parts of the range.
