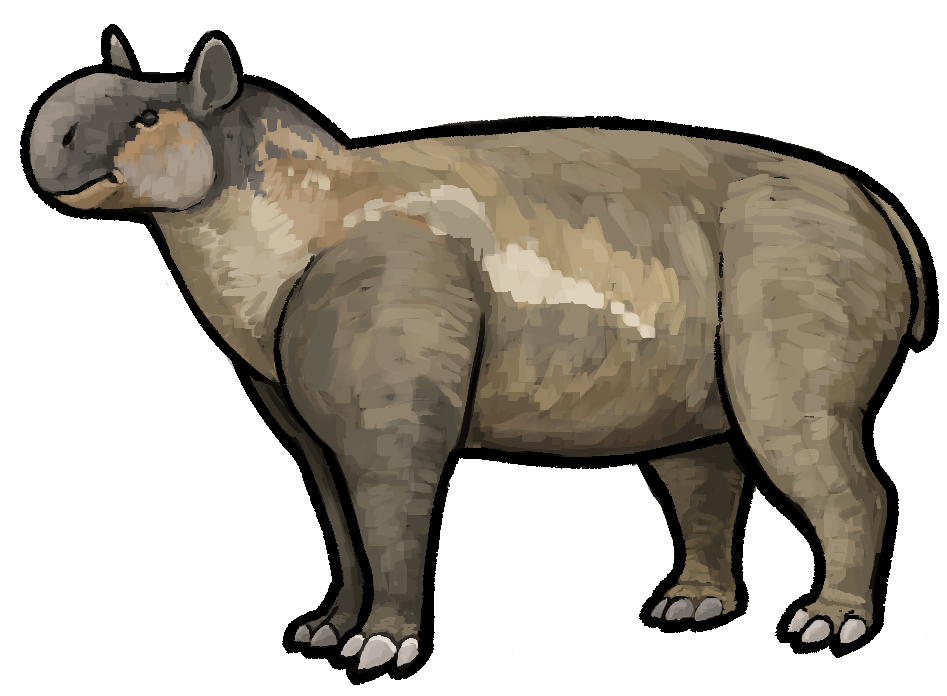
- Life Restoration

Scientific classification
- Kingdom: Animalia
- Phylum: Chordata
- Class: Mammalia
- Order: Perissodactyla
- Family: †Helaletidae
- Genus: †Thuliadanta; Eberle, 2005
- Species: †T. mayri

Binomial name
- †Thuliadanta mayri Eberle, 2005

= Thuliadanta =

Thuliadanta Temporal range: Early Eocene

Extinct genus of ceratomorph

Thuliadanta is an extinct genus of ceratomorph perissodactyl closely related to modern tapirs that is known from the early Eocene Margaret Formation of Arctic Canada (Nunavut and Northwest Territories).

== Paleogeographic significance ==
Thuliadenta is known from the highest northern latitudinal region of any extinct tapiroid, indicating a possible North American origin for Tapiroidea. Judging from the use of the mountain tapir as an analogue, Thuliadanta may have been a year-round inhabitant in the mild temperate lowland forests of the Eocene High Arctic.
