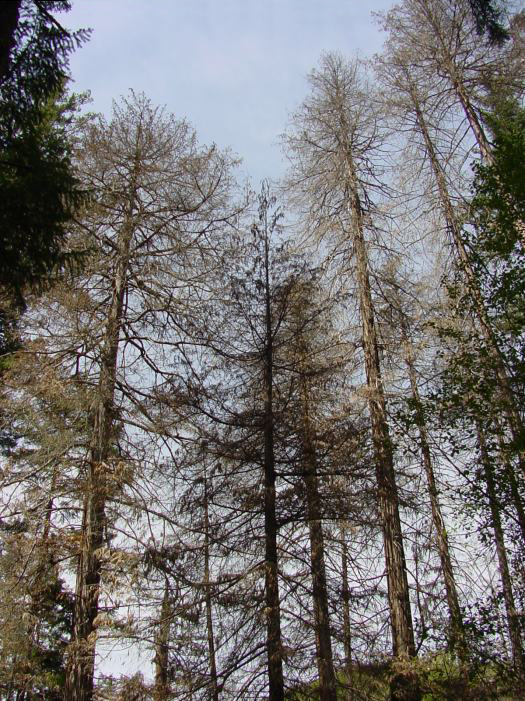
- A Port Orford cedar tree killed by Phytophthora lateralis

Scientific classification
- Domain: Eukaryota
- Clade: Sar
- Clade: Stramenopiles
- Phylum: Oomycota
- Class: Peronosporomycetes
- Order: Peronosporales
- Family: Peronosporaceae
- Genus: Phytophthora
- Species: P. lateralis

Binomial name
- Phytophthora lateralis Tucker & Milbrath, (1942)

= Phytophthora lateralis =

Species of single-celled organism

Phytophthora lateralis is a soil-borne plant pathogen that causes cedar root disease in Port Orford cedars (Chamaecyparis lawsoniana). This pathogen was first noted to cause disease in around 1920 on nursery stock near Seattle. Pacific yew (Taxus brevifolia) is also vulnerable to P. lateralis but less susceptible than Lawson cypress trees, and tree mortality has only been observed in areas where C. lawsoniana trees were also infected. Asiatic species of Chamaecyparis are generally described as resistant to P. lateralis, although this pathogen is occasionally isolated from Chamaecyparis obtusa (Hinoki cypress) in nurseries.

== Mode of infection ==
The most frequent symptoms of disease caused by P. lateralis are root and collar lesions. Trees become infected by their roots coming into contact with the zoospores in the soil or water. Hyphae then develop in larger roots and into the root collar where they kill the inner bark. Infrequent foliar infections resulting in branch lesions, have also been reported.

== Symptoms ==
The foliage of infected trees initially appears slightly lighter in colour than that of healthy trees. The whole canopy turns then to pale green, yellow and then light-brown when the tree is dying. As the pathogen extends from the roots and root collar up the trunks, a sharp margin is visible between necrotic phloem, discoloured to cinnamon brown and healthy cortical tissues.

== Distribution ==
Until recently, the known distribution area of P. lateralis was limited to Washington, Oregon, and California where it mostly occurs. In 2009, the pathogen was detected in soil of natural forests of C. obtusa in Taiwan, in agreement with a possible Asiatic origin for this species. Recent outbreaks have been recorded on C. lawsoniana in France, Scotland, Northern Ireland, and the Netherlands.

== Possible risks ==
Since C. lawsoniana and T. brevifolia are both key components of ecosystems on the Pacific Northwest Region of North-America, P. lateralis is threatening the ecological and economical values of forests where the pathogen occurs. In Europe, where C. lawsoniana is a widespread ornamental tree, P. lateralis could represent a serious threat, especially for the ornamental plant industry if it becomes established. Because of its potential economic impact, this pathogen was added in 2006 to the A1 list of exotic species that the EPPO recommends to regulate as quarantine organisms. It was transferred to the A2 list in 2011 as it was then considered established in some EPPO countries.
