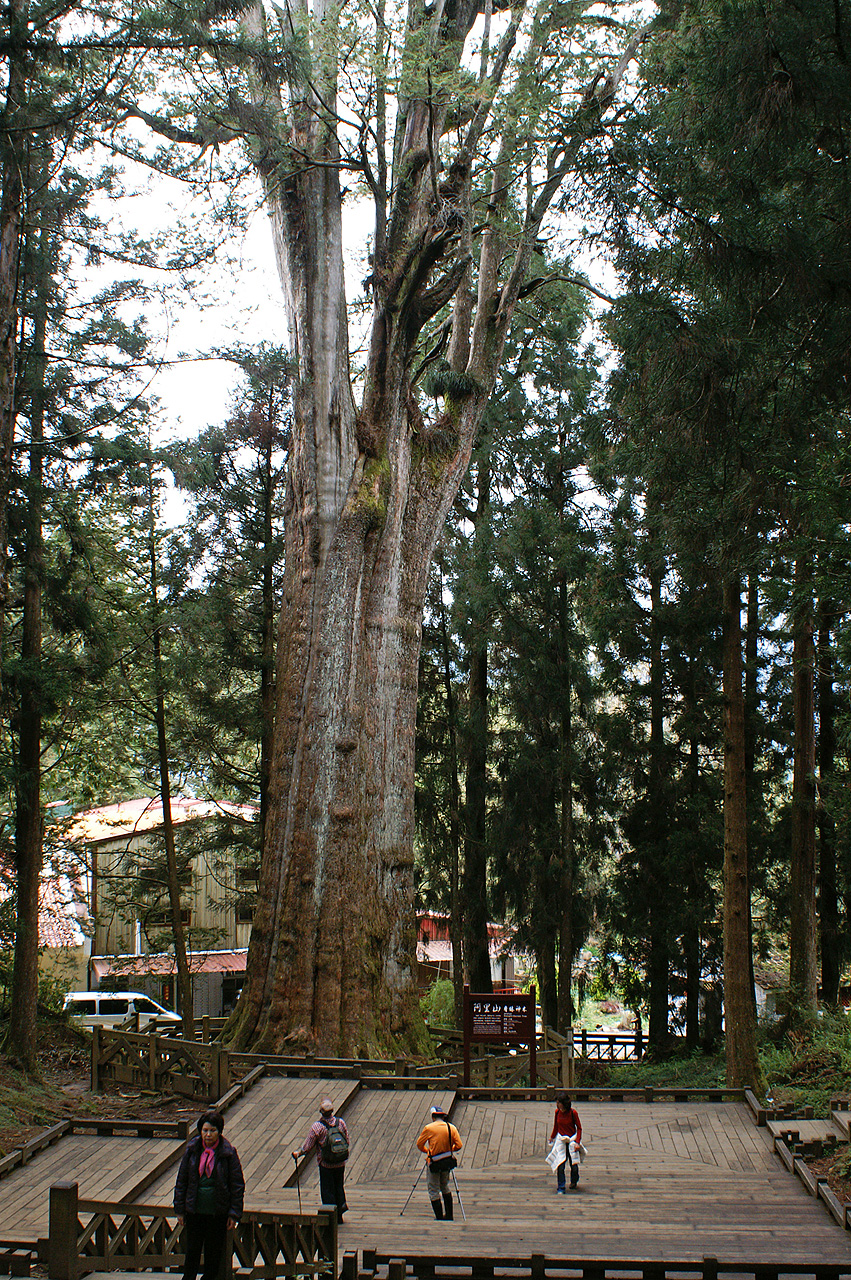

Conservation status
- Endangered (IUCN 3.1)

Scientific classification
- Kingdom: Plantae
- Clade: Embryophytes
- Clade: Tracheophytes
- Clade: Gymnosperms
- Division: Pinophyta
- Class: Pinopsida
- Order: Cupressales
- Family: Cupressaceae
- Genus: Chamaecyparis
- Species: C. formosensis

Binomial name
- Chamaecyparis formosensis Matsum.

= Chamaecyparis formosensis =

Species of conifer

Chamaecyparis formosensis (Formosan cypress, Taiwan cypress, Taiwan red cypress; Chinese: 紅檜/红桧 hóngguì, Taiwan pron. hóngkuài) is a species of large conifer in the cypress family, Cupressaceae, endemic to Taiwan, where it grows in the central mountains at moderate to high altitudes of 1000–2900 m. It is threatened by habitat loss and over-cutting for its valuable timber.

== Growth ==
It is a slow-growing, but long-lived and ultimately large to very large coniferous tree growing to 55–60 m tall with a trunk up to 7 m in diameter. The bark is red-brown, vertically fissured and with a stringy texture. The foliage is arranged in flat sprays; adult leaves are scale-like, 1–3 mm long, with pointed tips, green both above and below with only an inconspicuous stomatal band at the base of each scale-leaf; they are arranged in opposite decussate pairs on the shoots. The juvenile leaves, found on young seedlings, are needle-like, 4–8 mm long, soft and glaucous bluish-green. The cones are ovoid-oblong, 6–12 mm long and 4–8 mm diameter, with 8–16 scales arranged in opposite pairs, maturing in autumn about 7–8 months after pollination.

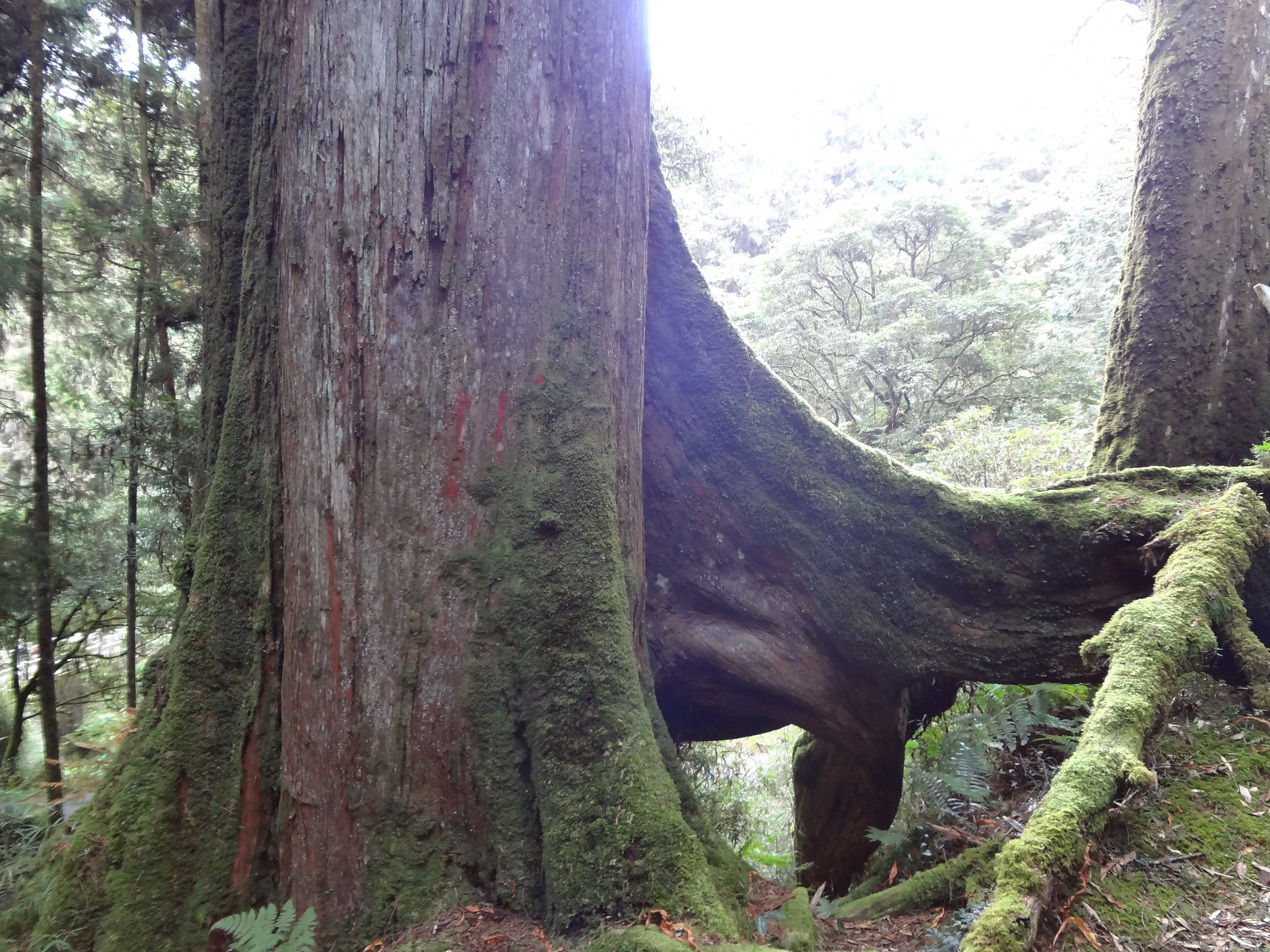
Stringy bark.

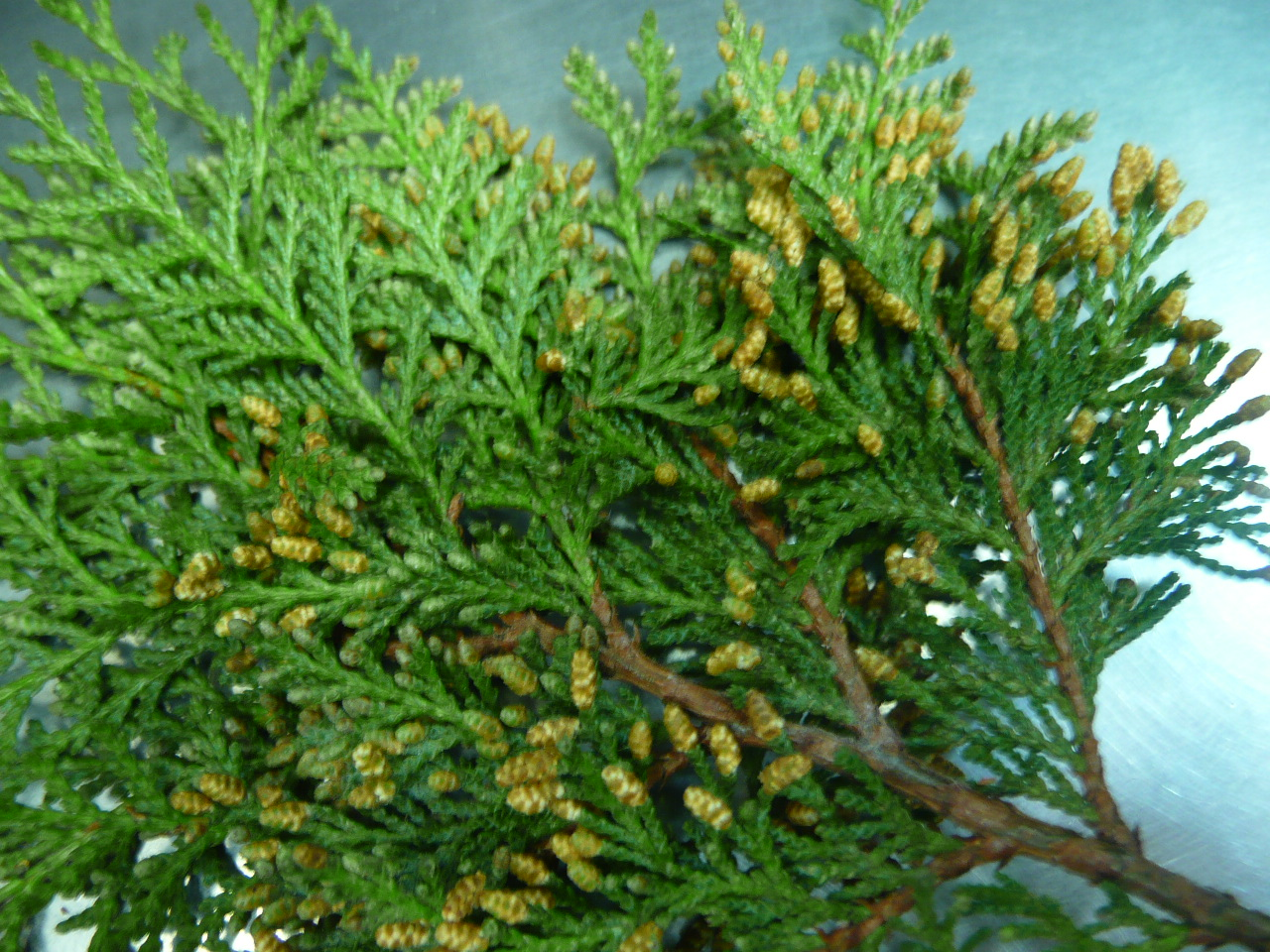
Foliage and pollen cones.

== Related species ==
It is most closely related to the Japanese Chamaecyparis pisifera (sawara cypress), which differs in smaller globose cones 4–8 mm long with 6–10 scales.

== Characteristics ==
The wood is soft, very resistant to decay, and strongly scented; it is highly valued in traditional Taiwanese building, particularly for temples and shrines. This has led to excessive harvesting, resulting in the species now being endangered. A small number of the oldest and largest specimens are protected as national monuments, but much of the general population of the species still remains unprotected.

Essential oil distilled from its wood is uniquely scented and highly valued.

== Notable examples ==
=== Sacred Tree of Alishan ===
The Sacred Tree of Alishan was a 3,000-year-old Taiwan red cypress which died from a lightning strike in 1956. The trunk remained standing until 1998. Due to its sacred status it was left alone by the Japanese when they deforested the surrounding area.
