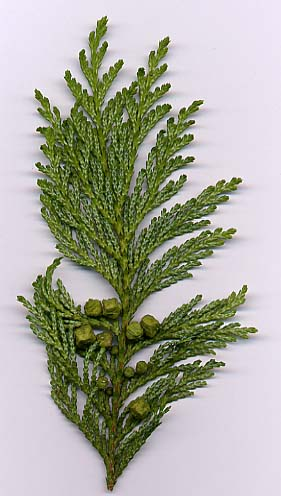
- Chamaecyparis pisifera foliage and cones

Scientific classification
- Kingdom: Plantae
- Clade: Tracheophytes
- Clade: Gymnosperms
- Division: Pinophyta
- Class: Pinopsida
- Order: Cupressales
- Family: Cupressaceae
- Subfamily: Cupressoideae
- Genus: Chamaecyparis; Spach

Type species
- Chamaecyparis sphaeroidea (Spreng.) Spach

Synonyms
- Abela Salisb.; Chamaepeuce Zucc. 1841 non DC. 1838; Fokienia Henry & Thomas; Retinispora Siebold & Zucc.; Shishindenia Makino ex Koidz.

= Chamaecyparis =

Genus of conifers

Chamaecyparis, the false-cypresses (to distinguish it from related true cypresses), is a genus of conifers in the cypress family Cupressaceae, native to eastern Asia (Japan and Taiwan) and to the western and eastern margins of the United States. The name is derived from the Greek khamai (χαμαί), meaning "on the earth", and kuparissos (κυπάρισσος) for "cypress".

They are medium-sized to large trees growing from 20–70 m (66–230 ft) tall, with foliage in flat sprays. The leaves are of two types, needle-like juvenile leaves on young seedlings up to a year old, and scale-like adult leaves. The cones are globose to oval, with 8-14 scales arranged in opposite decussate pairs; each scale bears 2-4 small seeds.

== Taxonomy ==
=== Phylogeny ===
Stull et al. 2021

- Chamaecyparis
  - - C. thyoides (von Linné) Britton, Sterns & Poggenburg (Atlantic white cedar)
    - - C. formosensis Matsum. (Taiwan red cypress)
      - C. pisifera (von Siebold & Zuccarini) Endlicher (Sawara cypress)
  - - C. hodginsii (Dunn) Rushforth (Fujian cypress)
    - - C. lawsoniana (Murray) Parlatore (Port Orford cedar)
      - C. obtusa (von Siebold & Zuccarini) Endlicher (Japanese cypress)

=== Species ===
- Chamaecyparis formosensis Matsum. – Taiwan
- Chamaecyparis lawsoniana (A.Murray) Parl., Port Orford cedar or Lawson cypress – California, Oregon, Washington
- Chamaecyparis obtusa (Siebold & Zucc.) Endl. – Japan
- Chamaecyparis pisifera (Siebold & Zucc.) Endl. – Honshu, Kyushu
- Chamaecyparis taiwanensis Masam. & Suzuki – Taiwan
- Chamaecyparis thyoides (L.) Britton, Atlantic white cedar (among other names) – Eastern United States (Mississippi to Maine)

Chamaecyparis taiwanensis is treated by many authors as a variety of C. obtusa (as C. obtusa var. formosana).

Genus Fokienia is not always recognized as a separate genus from Chamaecyparis, in which case Chamaecyparis hodginsii (=Fokienia hodginsii) should be added to the above list. On the other hand, a species which used to be included in this genus, as Chamaecyparis nootkatensis, had been transferred on the basis of strong genetic and morphological evidence to the separate genus Xanthocyparis as Xanthocyparis nootkatensis in the early 2000s. After further phylogenetic work the species was moved to the monotypic genus Callitropsis nootkatensis, being sister to the genus Hesperocyparis, and both genera forming a clade with Xanthocyparis as its sister.

There are also several species described from the fossil record including:

- †Chamaecyparis eureka – Middle Eocene, Axel Heiberg Island, Canada.
- †Chamaecyparis linguaefolia – Early-Middle Oligocene, Colorado, USA.
- †Chamaecyparis ravenscragensis – (=Fokienia ravenscragensis), if genus Fokienia is not recognized.

Chamaecyparis species are used as food plants by the larva of some Lepidoptera species, including juniper pug and pine beauty.

== Cultivation and uses ==
Four species (C. lawsoniana, C. obtusa, C. pisifera, and C. thyoides) are of considerable importance as ornamental trees in horticulture; several hundred cultivars have been selected for various traits, including dwarf size, yellow, blue, silvery or variegated foliage, permanent retention of juvenile leaves, and thread-like shoots with reduced branching. In some areas, cultivation is limited by Phytophthora root rot diseases, with C. lawsoniana being particularly susceptible to P. lateralis.

The wood is scented, and is highly valued, particularly in Japan, where it is used for temple construction.
