= Buchanan Lake Formation =

Geologic unit of Eocene lacustrine deposits

- Stratigraphic range: Lutetian; 46.2–40.4 Ma
- Type: Formation
- Unit of: Eureka Sound Group

Location
- Region: Axel Heiberg Island, Nunavut
- Country: Canada

The Buchanan Lake Formation is a geologic formation on Axel Heiberg Island in Nunavut, and part of the Eureka Sound Group. The formation is divided into four members and preserves fossils dating back to the Lutetian stage. Numerous species of plants, including Larix, Picea, Pseudolarix, Pinus, and cypress trees, have been found here. These fossils reveal that back during the Eocene, this area was once a very humid environment that was covered in swamp forests. The animals that lived in this environment include brontotheres, ancient tapirs, primates, panthodonts like Coryphodon, rodents, alligators, snakes, turtles, and birds like Gastornis and Presbyornis lived in this environment.

== See also ==
- List of fossiliferous stratigraphic units in Nunavut
