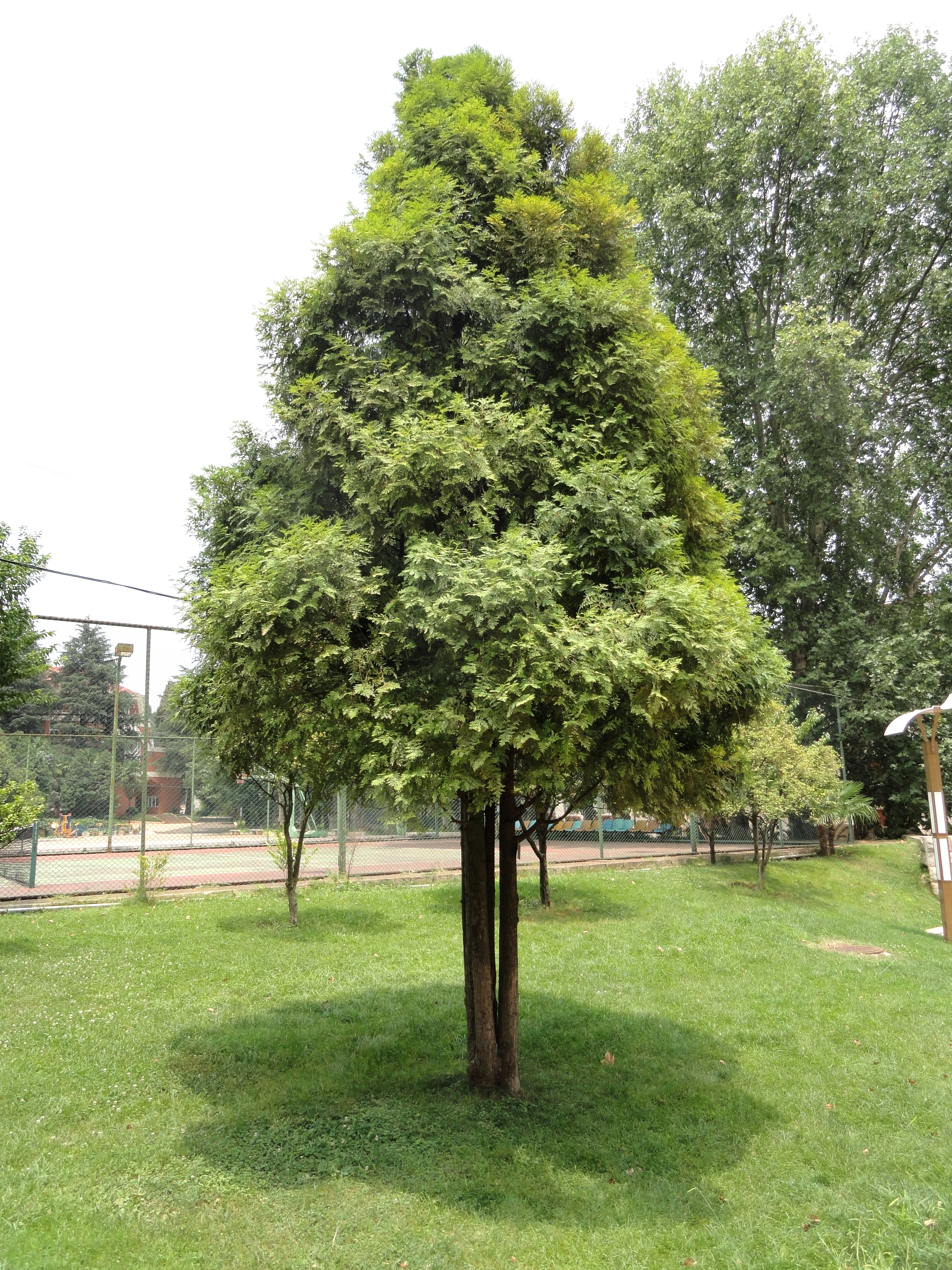

Conservation status
- Vulnerable (IUCN 3.1)

Scientific classification
- Kingdom: Plantae
- Clade: Tracheophytes
- Clade: Gymnosperms
- Division: Pinophyta
- Class: Pinopsida
- Order: Cupressales
- Family: Cupressaceae
- Subfamily: Cupressoideae
- Genus: Fokienia; A.Henry & H.H.Thomas
- Species: F. hodginsii

Binomial name
- Fokienia hodginsii (Dunn) A.Henry & H.H.Thomas

= Fokienia =

Genus of conifers

Fokienia is a monotypic genus of conifer in the cypress family, Cupressaceae. In its characteristics, Fokienia is intermediate between the genera of Chamaecyparis and Calocedrus. Genetically Fokienia is much closer to Chamaecyparis, and not all researchers recognize Fokienia as a separate genus. The genus comprises only one living species, Fokienia hodginsii or Fujian cypress (Chinese: 福建柏; pinyin: Fújiànbǎi; Vietnamese: Pơmu), and one fossil species (Fokienia ravenscragensis).

Fokienia hodginsii is native from southeastern China (provinces of Zhejiang, Guizhou, Yunnan and Fujian) to Northern Vietnam (provinces of Ha Bac, Hà Giang, Hà Tĩnh, Hòa Bình, Sơn La, Nghệ An, Lào Cai, Lai Châu, Thanh Hóa, Tuyên Quang, Yên Bái and Vĩnh Phú), west central Vietnam (provinces of Đắk Lắk, Gia Lai, Lâm Đồng), and west to northern Laos. The name derives from the old romanised name of Fujian province, China, from where the first specimen was introduced to Europe, collected by Captain Hodgins in 1908.

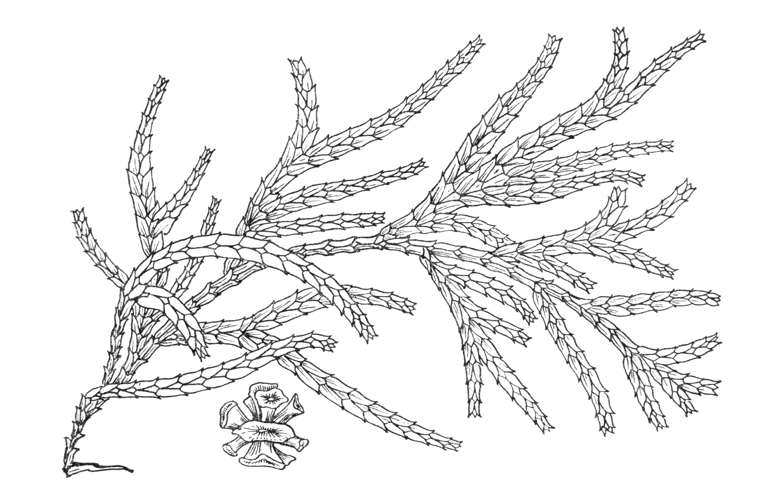
Fokienia hodginsii

Fokienia is a medium-sized tree, 25–30 m tall. It has greyish-brownish bark that peels off when the tree is young. On older trees, the bark presents longitudinal fissures and becomes aromatic. The leaves are arranged in flattened branchlet systems, with the branchlets in one plane. The leaves on adult trees are in opposite decussate pairs, the alternating pairs not evenly spaced so appearing as whorls of 4 at the same level; they are sub-acute, about 2–5 mm long, glossy green above, and with white stomatal bands below. The lateral leaves are ovate and compressed, and facial leaves are oblanceolate with a triangular apex. On young trees, the leaves are larger, up to 8–10 mm long and 6 mm broad.

The male cones are oval or cylindrical, around 2.5 mm long, terminal on the shoots. They have from 3 to 5 pairs of scales. The female cones are much larger, 15–25 mm long and 14–22 mm broad, globose or sub-globose, and ripen in the second year. They have 5-8 pairs of scales. There are two winged seeds on each scale. They are around 4 mm long, angular and pointed. On the upper and lower surfaces there are 2 large resin blisters. The wings are lateral and very unequal.

The tree does not tolerate shade, and requires mild climate and abundant rainfall to grow best. It occurs mainly on humid soil in montane habitats. In Vietnam, it grows on limestone or granite terrain above 900 m elevation.

The fossil species Fokienia ravenscragensis was described from the early Paleocene (66-60 m.a. before present) Ravenscrag formation of southwest Saskatchewan and adjacent Alberta, Canada.

== Uses ==
The wood is very much like that of other cedars in cypress family with a fine, straight grain and distinct aroma. Laotian and Dao tribesmen use Fujian cypress timber for wall partitioning or roofing. The timber was formerly used for coffins and is occasionally referred to as "coffinwood". In Vietnam, it is considered a precious timber because of its characteristic aroma and its exceptional density; therefore it is used to make art works, pieces of furniture, and charcoal of high heat value. It is considered an ecologically threatened species in Vietnam.

Distillation, especially of its root, gives an essential oil called siam wood or pemou oil used in aromatherapy.

In China, freshly harvested green cypress branches are burned to smoke and cure salted meat and sausage, sometimes in combination with pomelo and tangerine peels.
