= Eureka Sound Group =

Geologic group in Nunavut, Canada

- Stratigraphic range: Campanian-Eocene
- Type: Group

Location
- Region: Nunavut
- Country: Canada

The Eureka Sound Group is a geologic group in Nunavut. It preserves fossils dating from the Cretaceous to the Paleogene period.

== See also ==
- List of fossiliferous stratigraphic units in Nunavut
