= List of fossiliferous stratigraphic units in the Northwest Territories =

This is a list of fossiliferous stratigraphic units in the Northwest Territories, Canada.

Group or formation	Period	Notes
Alexandra Formation	Devonian	
Bad Cache Rapids Formation	Ordovician	
Bad Cache Rapids Formation	Ordovician	
Barlow Inlet Formation	Silurian	
Bear Rock Formation	Devonian	
Blue Fjord Formation	Devonian	
Blueflower Formation	Ediacaran	
Boas River Formation	Ordovician	
Broken Skull Formation	Ordovician	
Buchanan Lake Formation	Paleogene	
Bug Creek Formation	Jurassic	
Bug Creek Group/Almstrom Creek Formation	Jurassic	
Bug Creek Group/Murray Ridge Formation	Jurassic	
Cape Phillips Formation	Silurian	
Christopher Formation	Cretaceous	
Churchill River Formation	Ordovician	
Deer Bay Formation	Cretaceous	
Delorme Formation	Devonian, Silurian	
Douro Formation	Silurian	
Esbataottine Formation	Ordovician	
Eureka Sound Group/Margaret Formation	Paleogene	
Fort Simpson Formation	Devonian	
Funeral Formation	Devonian	
Hare Indian Formation	Devonian	
Haughton Formation	Neogene	
Hay River Formation	Devonian	
Headless Formation	Devonian	
Heiberg Formation	Jurassic, Triassic	
Hiccles Cove Formation	Jurassic	
Horn Plateau Formation	Devonian	
Hume Formation	Devonian	
Imperial Formation	Devonian	
Ingta Formation	Ediacaran, Cambrian	
Isachsen Formation	Cretaceous	
Kakisa Formation	Devonian	
Kee Scarp Formation	Devonian	
Loon River Formation	Cretaceous	
Manuel Creek Formation	Jurassic	
Mason River Formation	Cretaceous	
Mokka Fiord Formation	Paleogene	
Mount Cap Formation	Cambrian	
Mount Goodenough Formation	Cretaceous	
Nahanni Formation	Devonian	
Okse Bay Group/Norstrand Formation	Devonian	
Pine Point Formation	Devonian	
Ramparts Formation	Devonian	
Rat River Formation	Cretaceous	
Read Bay Formation	Silurian	
Red Head Rapids Formation	Ordovician	
Redknife Formation	Devonian	
Ringnes Formation	Jurassic	
Road River Formation	Silurian, Ordovician, Cambrian	
Rockslide Formation	Cambrian	
Sans Sault Formation	Cretaceous	
Schei Point Formation	Triassic	
Sekwi Formation	Cambrian	
Sheepbed Formation	Ediacaran	
Ship Point Formation	Ordovician	
Slave Point Formation	Devonian	
Smoking Hills Formation	Cretaceous	
Sulphur Point Formation	Devonian	
Summit Creek Formation	Cretaceous	
Sunblood Formation	Ordovician	
Sutherland River Formation	Silurian	
Tathlina Formation	Devonian	
Trold Fiord Formation	Permian	
Twin Falls Formation	Devonian	
Vendom Fiord Formation	Devonian	
Vunta Formation	Silurian, Ordovician	
Whittaker Formation	Silurian, Ordovician	
Williams Island Formation	Devonian	
Windermere Group/Twitya Formation	Ediacaran	
