= List of fossiliferous stratigraphic units in Yukon =

This is a list of fossiliferous stratigraphic units in Yukon, Canada.

Group or formation	Period	Notes
Aksala Formation	Triassic	
Almstrom Creek Formation	Jurassic	
Arctic Red Formation	Cretaceous	
Bluish Grey Shale Formation	Cretaceous	
Bonnet Plume Formation	Cretaceous	
Bug Creek Formation	Jurassic	
Bug Creek Group/Almstrom Creek Formation	Jurassic	
Bug Creek Group/Manuel Creek Formation	Jurassic	
Bug Creek Group/Murray Ridge Formation	Jurassic	
Dark Grey Siltstone Formation	Cretaceous	
Ettrain Formation	Carboniferous	
Fifteenmile Formation	Cryogenian	
Goz Siltstone Formation	Ediacaran	
Husky Formation	Jurassic	
Jones Ridge Limestone Formation	Ordovician	
Jungle Creek Formation	Permian, Carboniferous	
Kingak Formation	Jurassic	
Kingak Shale Formation	Jurassic	
Kulthieth Formation	Paleogene	
Laberge Formation	Jurassic	
Lewes River Formation	Triassic	
Lewes River Group/"F" Formation	Triassic	
McCann Hill Formation	Devonian	
North Branch Formation	Cretaceous, Jurassic	
Otuk Formation	Triassic	
Prongs Creek Formation	Devonian	
Rabbitkettle Formation	Ordovician, Cambrian	
Road River Formation	Devonian, Silurian, Ordovician	
Royal Creek Formation	Devonian	
Sadlerochit Formation	Permian	
Sekwi Formation	Cambrian	
Siltstone Unit 1 Formation	Ediacaran	
Siltstone Unit 2 Formation	Ediacaran	
Sunblood Formation	Ordovician	
Tahkandit Formation	Permian	
Takhandit Formation	Permian	
Tantalus Formation	Jurassic	
Wernecke Mountains Group/Illtyd Formation	Cambrian	
Wernecke Mountains Group/Illtyd formation Formation	Cambrian	
White and Coaly Quartzite Formation	Cretaceous	
White and Coaly Quartzite Division Formation	Cretaceous	

== Bibliography ==
- Various Contributors to the Paleobiology Database. "Fossilworks: Gateway to the Paleobiology Database".
