= Nadaleen Formation =

Geologic formation in Canada

- Stratigraphic range: late Ediacaran; ~575–574 Ma
- Type: Formation
- Unit of: Rackla Group
- Sub-units: See: Members
- Underlies: Gametrail Formation
- Overlies: Sheepbed Formation
- Thickness: 50–600 m (160–1,970 ft)

Location
- Coordinates: 64°0′N 132°15′W
- Region: Yukon
- Country: Canada

Type section
- Named for: Nadaleen River
- Named by: Moynihan et al.
- Year defined: 2019
- Nadaleen Formation (Canada) Nadaleen Formation (Yukon)

The Nadaleen Formation is a geologic formation in the Wernecke Mountains of the Northwest Territories and Yukon, Canada. It preserves fossils dating back to the Ediacaran period.

== History of research ==
Prior to its formalisation, the Nadaleen Formation was once a part of the underlying Sheepbed Formation. The upper layers of the Sheepbed Formation would be noted to be different from the rest of the formation in 2013, and was given the informal name of the "June Beds", after the nearby June Lake. A few years later in 2019, the June Beds would be formally defined, with the formation taking on the formal name of the "Nadaleen Formation", after the nearby Nadaleen River.

== Geology ==
The Nadaleen Formation is primarily composed of various carbonate and siliciclastic rocks, with an abundance of sandstones, conglomerates, and rudstone, and contains five informal members. It is overlain by the dolomite dominated Gametrail Formation, whilst it is underlain by the Shale dominated Sheepbed Formation, and it is a part of the wider Rackla Group.

=== Members ===
The formations contains up to five informal members, which are as follows, in stratigraphic order (lowest to highest):

- Lower carbonate member: This member, which is up to 60 m (200 ft) thick, is predominately composed of gray carbonate-clast rudstone and grainstone, which are inter-bedded with coarse-grained calcareous sandstone, grainstone, and granule-pebble conglomerate. The clasts found within the rudstone layers range in size from pebble to boulder, and also contain pale-gray limestone and yellow-orange dolostone set within a sandy matrix.
- Heterolithic member: This member is predominately composed of a mix of sandstone and calcareous sandstone, shale, limestone, and calcareous conglomerate. Within some of the sandstone layers there can be found reworked ooids, whilst the conglomerate contains clasts of oolitic limestone. These sandstone and conglomerate layers also notably range from thick, massive to normal graded, preserving soft-sediment deformation. The limestone and shale layers are thin to medium-bedded in nature, and contain sparse examples of Bouma sequence structures. At the base of these structures there can be found scour surfaces, sole marks, flutes and mudstone intra-clasts. Meanwhile, at the top of the member there can also be found a thick layer of dark-gray to brown olistostrome rudstone, which contains a sparse collection of clasts which are both of shallow and deep-marine origin. This member is also fossiliferous in nature.
- Upper carbonate member: This member is dominated by a repeated succession of thin to medium-bedded dark-gray to black limestone and shale, which are arranged within partial to complete Bouma sequences. Through the member there can also be found beds of rudstone, whilst the top of the formation there is a layer up to 30 m (98 ft) thick composed of carbonate pebble to boulder rudstone.
- Black shale member: This member is primarily composed of black shale from its base to the middle, whilst nearer to the top it is composed of turbiditic sandstone containing quartz arenite to sublitharenite.
- Green siliciclastic member: This member is predominately composed of green, rusty orange weathering, rhythmically bedded mudstone, siltstone, and sandstone. Throughout this member, the sediments can also appear gray and maroon in colour also. Within the upper layers of this member there is an abundance of normal-graded partial Bouma sequences.

== Depositional environment ==
The Nadaleen Formation is inferred to have been deposited on a slope to basin-floor environment, primarily due to the rhythmic layering of various sediments, suggested to be the result of hemipelagic sedimentation, as well as the number of Bouma sequences throughout the formation, which form from deep-marine turbidity currents.

== Dating ==
The top of the Nadaleen Formation has been dated using Re–Os dating on samples of carbonaceous shale and mudstone. These collected samples yielded a date range of 574.0±4.7 Ma and 575.0±5.1 Ma, roughly correlating the formation with the Drook Formation in Newfoundland. This also showed that at this point time time, the frondose organisms seen in both the Nadaleen and Drook Formations had established themselves before the Shuram excursion anomaly seen in the overlying Gametrail Formation.

== Paleobiota ==
The Nadaleen Formation contains a variety of fossils, ranging from the classic discoidal forms such as Aspidella, to varying petalonamids such as Namalia and Beothukis. All fossils were originally a part of the underlying Sheepbed Formation, although as this is no longer the case, the Nadaleen Formation currently hosts the earliest examples of Ediacaran fossils in the Rackla Group.

Color key: Taxon / Reclassified taxon / Taxon falsely reported as present / Dubious taxon or junior synonym / Ichnotaxon / Ootaxon / Morphotaxon

Notes
Uncertain or tentative taxa are in small text
~~crossed out~~ taxa are discredited.

=== Petalonamae ===
Genus	Species	Notes	Images
Charnia	Charnia cf. C. masoni	Frondose organism, comparable to the type species Charnia masoni, but poor preservation precludes formal assignment of the material to the species.	
Charniodiscus	Charniodiscus sp.	Frondose organism.	
Beothukis	Beothukis cf. B. mistakensis	Frondose organism, comparable to the type species Beothukis mistakensis, but poor preservation precludes formal assignment of the material to the species.	
Fractofusus	Fractofusus cf. F. andersoni	Spindle-like frondose organism, comparable to the type species Fractofusus andersoni, but poor preservation precludes formal assignment of the material to the species.	
Namalia	Namaliaus sp.	Conical-shaped frondose organism.	
Primocandelabrum	Primocandelabrum sp.	Feather duster-shaped frondose organism.	

=== incertae sedis ===
Genus	Species	Notes	Images
Aspidella	Aspidella sp.	Discoidal organism. May represent the holdfast of a frondose organism.	
Cyclomedusa	Cyclomedusa sp.	Discoidal organism. May represent the holdfast of a frondose organism.	
Ediacaria	E. flindersi	Discoidal organism. May represent the holdfast of a frondose organism.	
Eoporpita	Eoporpita sp.	Tentacled discoidal organism. May represent the holdfast of a frondose organism.	
Hiemalora	Hiemalora sp.	Tentacled discoidal organism. May represent the holdfast of a frondose organism.	
Kullingia	Kullingia sp.	Discoidal organism. May represent the holdfast of a frondose organism.	
Medusinites	M. asteroides	Discoidal organism. May represent the holdfast of a frondose organism.	
Spriggia	Spriggia sp.	Discoidal organism. May represent the holdfast of a frondose organism.	

== See also ==
- List of fossiliferous stratigraphic units in Yukon
