= Gametrail Formation =

Geologic formation in Canada

- Stratigraphic range: late Ediacaran; ~567.3 Ma
- Type: Formation
- Unit of: Rackla Group
- Underlies: (Conformably and Unconformably) Blueflower Formation
- Overlies: Nadaleen Formation
- Thickness: 650 m (2,130 ft)

Lithology
- Primary: Dolomite
- Other: Mudstone, Grainstone, Packstone, and Wackestone

Location
- Coordinates: 63°24.45′N 128°26.00′W
- Region: Northwest Territories and Yukon
- Country: Canada

Type section
- Named for: Gametrail Creek
- Named by: Aitken
- Year defined: 1989
- Gametrail Formation (Canada) Gametrail Formation (Northwest Territories)

The Gametrail Formation is a geologic formation in the Wernecke Mountains of the Northwest Territories and Yukon, Canada. It preserves fossils dating back to the Ediacaran period.

== History of research ==
In 1982, fossils from a locality nearby the Goz Creek were found, although at this point there was no formal formation to assign them to. A few years later, in 1987, more fossils would be found, and now were assignable to an informal formation, referred to as the "Goz siltstone". Then, in 1992, the "Goz Siltstone" would be assigned to the formal Gametrail Formation, which had been described and named a few years prior in 1989 by Aitken.

== Geology ==
The Gametrail Formation is predominately composed of dolomites, which themselves are composed of lime grainstones and algal stromatolites, as well as ribbon-bedded lime mudstone and derived dolomite in the Sewki Brook area. South of June Lake, the Gametrail formation is still composed of ribbon-bedded lime mudstone, although now contains thick-bedded debris-flow breccias, as well as intra-clast packstone and wackestone.

It is both conformably and unconformably overlain by the siliciclastic Blueflower Formation, whilst it is underlain by the carbonate Nadaleen Formation, and it is a part of the wider Rackla Group.

== Depositional environment ==
The Gametrail Formation within the Sekwi Brook area is inferred to have been deposited on a marine continental slope, from the abundance of breccia within its upper layers, and was most likely of a transitional environment from shallow to deep waters, with the slope being situated on the outer part of a carbonate ramp.

== Shuram excursion anomaly ==
Found recorded within the Gametrail Formation is a Shuram excursion, where there is a sudden negative δ13C anomaly, with Carbon-13 levels dropping from +4% to nearly -7%, which then sharply recover back up to around 0% near the boundary between the Gametrail and Blueflower formations, and is suggested to have potentially occurred at the same time as a global Shuram–Wonoka excursion.

The exact age of the formation has remained fairly unknown for a number of decades, originally being placed around 550 million years ago due to the fact of White Sea aged fossils. A study done in 2024 noted that new geochronological constraints had been applied to the Shuram excursion within the Gametrail Formation, placing roughly within the temporal range of the Avalon assemblage, whilst the overlying layers of the Blueflower Formation would be roughly placed with in the temporal range of the White Sea assemblage bewtween 560 million years ago and 550 million years ago. Thorough Re–Os dating done near the boundary between the Gametrail and Blueflower formations would see this date refined to 567.3±3 Ma, placing the Gametrail well within the temporal range of the Avalon assemblage.

== Paleobiota ==
A somewhat large amount of fossil material had originally been reported from the top of the Gametrail Formation between 1983 and 2000, ranging from discoidal fossils such as Cyclomedusa and the holdfast structure of Charniodiscus, to ichnogenera burrows such as Planolites. Although since these reports, these layers were later re-assigned to the base of the overlying Blueflower Formation, resulting in the Gametrail Formation becoming unfossiliferous in nature. There have been recent studies calling for the lower member of the Blueflower Formation to be assigned to the Gametrail, which would introduce a range of fossils from Dickinsonia to Funisia to the formation.

Although no new stratigraphic subdivision has yet to be formalised and as such bringing in a whole assemblage of fossils, fossil material was once again found within the Gametrail Formation, ranging from holdfast-like structures and simple trace fossils, to rare body fossils of the tubular organism Sekwitubulus, making the formation fossiliferous in nature again.

Color key: Taxon / Reclassified taxon / Taxon falsely reported as present / Dubious taxon or junior synonym / Ichnotaxon / Ootaxon / Morphotaxon

Notes
Uncertain or tentative taxa are in small text
~~crossed out~~ taxa are discredited.

=== incertae sedis ===
Genus	Species	Notes	Images
Sekwitubulus	Sekwitubulus sp.	Tubular organism.	

=== Undescribed ===
Genus	Species	Notes	Images
"Holdfast"	???	Holdfast-like structure, bares similarities to Eoporpita and Hiemalora.	
"Horizontal trace fossils"	???	Simple trace fossils from the upper layers of the formation.	

== See also ==
- List of fossiliferous stratigraphic units in Yukon
- List of fossiliferous stratigraphic units in the Northwest Territories
