= Devon Island Formation =

Geologic formation in Nunavut, Canada

- Stratigraphic range: Silurian - Devonian
- Type: Formation

Location
- Region: Nunavut
- Country: Canada

The Devon Island Formation is a geologic formation in the Canadian Arctic. It preserves fossils dating back to the late Silurian and Devonian periods.

The formation was originally named by Raymond Thorsteinsson for a sequence of calcareous, graptolitic mudrocks on northern Devon Island situated between the Douro Formation below and the Sutherland River Formation above. The latter formation is now considered synonymous with the Goose Fiord Formation. The Devon Island Formation extends from the west coast of Devon Island through the Grinnell Peninsula, and well across the southern part of Ellesmere Island.

== See also ==
- List of fossiliferous stratigraphic units in Nunavut
