= Pavy =

Pavy may refer to:

== People with the surname ==
- Amery of Pavy, 14th-century English knight
- Béatrice Pavy (born 1958), French politician
- Emily Dorothea Pavy (1885–1967), Australian teacher, sociologist and lawyer
- Felix Octave Pavy (1879–1962), American politician
- Frederick William Pavy (1829–1911), British physician
- Francis X. Pavy (born 1954), American painter and sculptor
- Louis-Antoine-Augustin Pavy (1805–1866), Bishop of Algiers from 1846 to 1866

== Other ==
- Pavy Formation, geologic formation in Canada.
