= Cape Rawson Formation =

Geologic formation in Nunavut, Canada

- Stratigraphic range: Late Ordovician-Middle Devonian, 450–390 Ma
- Type: Formation
- Underlies: Blue Fiord Formation

Location
- Coordinates: 76°N 85°W
- Region: Nunavut
- Country: Canada

The Cape Rawson Formation is a geologic formation in Nunavut. It preserves fossils that date back to both the Ordovician and Devonian periods. Because the Blue Fiord Formation lies on top of the formation, it has been determined that it predates the middle Devonian Period. It is located on the southern portion of the Ellesmere Island in Canada.

== Composition ==
100 feet of shale separates it from nearby fiord formations, including the Cornwallis Formation. Permanent fauna does not exist, however fossils suggest that the fiord may have been a thriving temperate climate over 200 million years ago. Many fossils have been detected inside the mass of limestone which overcuts the formation.

== Location ==
The majority of the fiord is located on the southern portion of Ellesmere Island. However, some of the fiord encroaches on some territory in the eastern and northeastern portions of the island.

== Relation to Other Fjords ==
The Cape Rawson Formation overcuts the Cape Phillips Formation. It also borders the Canyon Fiord Formation. Underwater rock beds of the fiord merge into the Greely Fiord.

== See also ==
- Blue Fiord Formation
- List of fossiliferous stratigraphic units in Nunavut
