= Assistance Formation =

Geologic formation on Devon and Ellesmere Islands in Nunavut, Canada

- Stratigraphic range: Permian (Roadian)
- Type: Formation

Location
- Region: Nunavut
- Country: Canada

The Assistance Formation is a geologic formation located on Devon Island and Ellesmere Island in Nunavut. It preserves fossils dating back to the Permian period. The formation rides along the southeastern edges of the Sverdrup Basin, as well as on Melville Island and Grinnell Peninsula.

== Discovery ==
The Assistance Formation was discovered in 1955 by Raymond Thorsteinsson, during Operation Franklin. Although the Trold Fiord Formation and Degerbols Formation were generally recognized as part of the Assistance Formation, Thorsteinsson clarified various terminology problems and cleared any naming discontinuities.

== Lithology ==
Fine grained, green/gray sandstone and mudstone compose a large part of the formation. The lower portions and beds of the stone are generally recessive, with and occur in beds up to .6 meters in length and depth. Outside of sandstone and rust-colored rocks, the loose components of the fiord usually include limestone and a plethora of perpetually eroding organic debris. In the upper half of the formation, oxidized, calcareous ironstone buildups remain abundant. On Melville Island and Grinnell Peninsula, the depth of the fiord is usually its lowest, averaging around 60 meters. The thickest parts of the fiord occur on Ellesmere Island.

== Stratigraphic importance ==
In 2009, fossil fauna of Assistance Formation was used to confirm the invalidity of the Ufimian stage in the Russian geologic time scale. Conodonts Mesogondolella gracilis and ammonoids Sverdrupites harkeri from this formation are characteristic of the Roadian (Kazanian) stage, while Mesogondolella idahoensis and ammonoids Epijuresanites from the underlying Sabine Bay Formation are typical for Upper Kungurian stage. Such correspondence to the stages completely excludes the presence of a "gap" between Sabine Bay and Assistance Formations for an additional Ufimian stage.

== See also ==
- List of fossiliferous stratigraphic units in Nunavut
