= Rabbitkettle Formation =

Geologic formation in Yukon, Canada

- Stratigraphic range: Late Cambrian – Tremadocian
- Type: Formation
- Underlies: Road River Formation; Whiterock Formation; Sunblood Formation; Broken Skull Formation (also laterally equivalent)
- Overlies: Sekwi Formation (unconformably)
- Thickness: 750 m

Location
- Region: Yukon
- Country: Canada

The Rabbitkettle Formation is a geologic formation in the Yukon, comprising thin bedded silty and occasionally siliciclastic limestones deposited in deep (below storm wave base) waters. It preserves fossils dating back to the Ordovician period.

According to it:

- Starts in the Late Cambrian; ends in late Tremadoc
- reaches 750m in thickness
- transitional slope facies
- Alternation of black calcareous mudstones and grey, burrowed wackestones

== See also ==
- List of fossiliferous stratigraphic units in Yukon
