= Isachsen Formation =

Geologic formation in Canada

- Stratigraphic range: Aptian; ~120–112 Ma
- Type: Formation
- Sub-units: Walker Island Member
- Overlies: Christopher Formation

Location
- Coordinates: 76.1°N 109.0°W
- Approximate paleocoordinates: 71.5°N 20.5°W
- Region: Northwest Territories, Nunavut
- Country: Canada
- Isachsen Formation (Canada) Isachsen Formation (Nunavut)

The Isachsen Formation is a geologic formation in the Northwest Territories and Nunavut. The Formation is a Lower Cretaceous siliciclastic succession exposed in the Sverdrup Basin of the Canadian Arctic.

Dating to the Aptian stage of the Cretaceous period, the formation is characterized by diverse sedimentary deposits. It preserves fossils of Polycotylidae indet., reflecting both a fluvio-deltaic and tidally-influenced marine history.

== See also ==
- List of fossiliferous stratigraphic units in the Northwest Territories
- List of fossiliferous stratigraphic units in Nunavut
