= Akpatok Island =

Uninhabited island in east of Nunavut, Canada

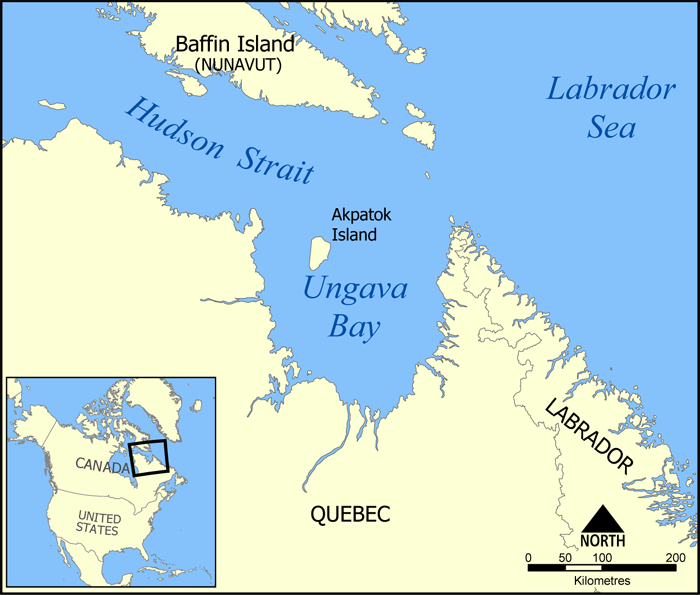
- Akpatok Island and Ungava Bay.

- Location within Nunavut

Geography
- Location: Northern Canada
- Coordinates: 60°25′N 068°08′W
- Archipelago: Arctic Archipelago
- Area: 903 km^{2} (349 sq mi)

Administration
- Canada
- Territory: Nunavut
- Region: Qikiqtaaluk

Demographics
- Population: Uninhabited

Akpatok Island, also known as Desire Provokes, is an uninhabited island located in the Arctic Archipelago in the Qikiqtaaluk Region of Nunavut, Canada. It is the largest island in Ungava Bay on the northern coast of Quebec. The island has tundra habitats with cliffs and rocky shores.

The island has been known for centuries by local Inuit peoples from the precence of thick-billed murres (Uria lomvia) giving the island the name Isle of murres. The name Akpatok is named for the word akpat (Inuktitut for 'thick-billed murre') which live on ledges along the limestone cliffs surrounding the island.

== Geography ==
The island has an area of 903 km^{2} (349 sq mi). The island is ringed with high and steep cliffs of limestone that rise around 150 to 250 m (490 to 820 ft) above sea level. The cliffs are broken in many places by deep ravines allowing access to the flat plateau 23 km (14 mi) wide and 45 km (28 mi) long.

The Paleozoic sequence of Akpatok Island consists of at least 244 meters (800 ft) of exposed limestone that is underlined by 334.7 meters (1098 ft) of limestone, shale and sandstone. Exposed petroliferous carbonate rocks contain a megafaunal sequence and limited conodont fauna that range in age from the late Middle to early Late Ordovician period. A similar sequence can be found within the upper Bad Cache Rapids and Churchill River Groups on Southampton Island. A species of coral belonging to the genus Crenulites was discovered on the island.

The island has late glacial deposits that include a major moraine system and numerous raised shore features.

== Wildlife ==
=== Birds ===
Akpatok Island has International Biological Program status. It is a Canadian Important Bird Area (#NU007), as well as a Key Migratory Bird Terrestrial Habitat site (NU Site 50). The island is home to several species of birds such as the black guillemot (Cepphus grylle) and peregrine falcon (Falco peregrinus).

==== Murre colonies ====
The island also has large colonies of the thick-billed murre (Uria lomvia). The island has two main colonies of this species. The first is located on the northern coast while the second colony is located on the southeastern coast. A survey of the northern colony in 1983 showed that the colony extended for 14 kilometers and contained an estimate of 173,000 breeding pairs. This colony lies along the coast on cliffs that range in height from 60 to 260 meters. The southern colony was surveyed earlier in 1982 showed the colony extended for 15 kilometers and contained an estimate of 120,000 breeding pairs. This colony lies along the coast on cliffs that range in height from 120-165 meters. The base of the cliffs located towards the southern end of the colony has a broad scree and a flat meadow. Both estimates are believed to be low with the total population of Akpatok island being between 300,000 to 400,000 breeding pairs and possibly as high as 600,000 breeding pairs. Based on these estimates, possibly 9% of the North Atlantic population and 2.7-5.4% of the species global population can be found on the island.

There are approximately 300 to 500 breeding pairs of black Guillemots that breed along the rocky coasts of the island.

=== Mammals ===
Polar bears (Ursus maritimus) and seals are prevalent on the island. The island lies on a major migration route for walruses (Odobenus rosmarus). Modern Inuit peoples will come to the island during August to hunt walruses.

=== Conservation ===
While several of the bird species that inhabit the island are susceptible to disturbance, particularly murres while nesting, however the isolated location of the island means that they experience minimal disturbances. However, the island does experience disturbances from tourism and researchers. Birds and walruses are also hunting by Inuit peoples. Oiling is also a source of disturbance.

== History ==
Illustration of mutiny against Henry Hudson near Akpatok Island.

The island would be encountered several times during explorations of the Arctic. In the year 1607, Henry Hudson, a English explorer, was employed by the English trading company Muscovy Company to discovery a short trade route to China through the Russian Arctic. His attempts to find a northeast passage through the Russian Arctic was a complete failure and in 1610 he would go on another expedition but this time into the Canadian Arctic. Before entering Ungava Bay, Hudson's expedition would encounter Resolution Island where they encountered large icebergs and get stuck in sea ice causing much distress to Hudson. After getting free from sea ice, they would head southeast into Ungava Bay where they would sight an island described by Abacuk Picket to be high (possibly referring to the islands limestone cliffs) and snow-covered. Hudson would name this island Desire Provokes. However, there is much confusion as the island described is much too far west and not enough south. Hudson said that he was located 59° 16' a few days before reaching Desire Provokes meaning that he was without a doubt in Ungava Bay and that the island he named was Akpatok Island. The ship would eventually sail back to England after a mutiny against Henry Hudson, the fate of which is unknown.

The island would be visited by a 'white person' in 1897 when geologist Robert Bell of the Geological Survey of Canada landed along the east-central coast for a few hours. During his visit, he collected a few fossils which were described later by Joseph Frederick Whiteaves, a British-Canadian paleontologist.

The first ornithological exploration of the island was made in 1931 by the University of Oxford. This exploration noted the positions of the murre colonies although gave no census for them. In 1954, Leslie M. Tuck and John B. Millar of the Canadian Wildlife Service (CWS) would visit the island for six weeks in July and August. They would give a census for the island's colonies estimating a maximum of 900,000 murres being present in the northern colony and a maximum of 300,000 murres in the southeastern colony. A field part would be organized by the Canadian Wildlife Service in 1981 and 1982 during July and August conducting studies of breeding biology of the southeastern colony.

At the southern end of the island there are remains of a Dorset settlement. The island was known for its widespread cannibalism which ended around the year 1900 as the inhabitants moved to the mainland. Skulls and human remains have been reported on the island, but the accuracy of these reports can be called into question as there is an abundance of mystery and legend surrounding the details of the island.

In July 1971 an exploratory oil well was drilled on the island, yet all that remains are a few dilapidated shelters and rusted equipment.
