= Tanquary =

Tanquary may refer to:

== People ==
- Kathryn Tanquary
- Maurice Cole Tanquary

== Other ==
- Tanquary Fiord
- Tanquary Fiord Airport
- Tanquary Formation
