= Bjorne Formation =

Geologic formation in Canada

- Stratigraphic range: Early Triassic
- Type: Geological formation
- Unit of: Sverdrup Basin
- Underlies: Murray Harbour Formation
- Overlies: Blind Fiord Formation; Lindstrom Formation; Trold Fiord Formation
- Thickness: 60–1,440 m (200–4,720 ft)

Lithology
- Primary: Sandstone, shale

Location
- Coordinates: 79.33°N 83.15°W
- Region: Canadian Arctic Archipelago
- Country: Canada

Type section
- Named by: Tozer
- Year defined: 1963
- Bjorne Formation (Canada)

The Bjorne Formation is a formation of sandstones and shales in the Canadian Arctic Archipelago. The southern edge of the formation includes petroleum reserves in Melville Island. The basin also includes Mackenzie King Island, Lougheed Island and portions of Prince Patrick Island, Borden Island, Ellef Ringnes Island, Amund Ringnes Island, and Cornwall Island.

The formation underlies the Murray Harbour Formation and overlies the Blind Fiord, Lindstrom and Trold Fiord Formations.

Oil and gas deposits are confirmed through the basin.

The southern and eastern margins are more than 1000 meters, sometimes nearly 2000 meters, thick.
