= Wynniatt Formation =

Geologic formation in Canada

- Stratigraphic range: late Tonian; ~848–761 Ma
- Type: Geological Formation
- Unit of: Shaler Supergroup
- Sub-units: Member 1, 2, 3 and 4
- Underlies: (Unconformably) Kilian Formation
- Overlies: Minto Inlet Formation
- Thickness: 500 - 800 m (1,640 - 2,624 ft)

Lithology
- Primary: Dolomite
- Other: Mudstone, Siltstone, Quartz arenite, Sandstone, Limestone, Gabbro

Location
- Region: Nunavut
- Country: Canada

The Wynniatt Formation is a geologic formation in Nunavut, and is a part of the wider Shaler Supergroup. It preserves enigmatic fossils in a shallow marine environment, dating back to the Middle to Late Tonian period, around 850 Ma - 760 Ma.

== Geology ==
The Wynniatt Formation, which is a part of the larger Shaler Supergroup, can be found outcropping in the Minto Inlier of Victoria Island. It is unconformably overlain by the sabkha-style evaporite and marine carbonate Kilian Formation, whilst it is conformably underlain by the sulphate evaporite and marine carbonate Minto Inlet Formation.

=== Members ===
The formation is composed of four informal members, which are as follows, in stratigraphic order (lowest to highest):

- Lower Carbonate Member: This member, which ranges between 85–130 m (279–427 ft) in thickness, is primarily composed of lime mudstone in its lower section, with small amounts of black shales, chert nodules, intra-clast breccias found throughout. In its middle section, the lime mudstone layers give way to cross-stratified grainstone, which is inter-bedded with lime mudstone and minor shales. Into the upper section of the member, the grainstone transitions into inter-bedded stromatolitic dolostone and black silty-shale. Using Re–Os dating, this member roughly correlates to the Snail Spring Formation.
- Black Shale Member: This member, which ranges between 10–200 m (33–656 ft) in thickness, is dominated by dark-gray siltstone and silty-shale, with clasts throughout. Near the contact to the Lower Carbonate Member can be found inter-bedded stromatolitic dolostones and dololutite. Further towards the top there can also be found thin- to medium-thick beds of ripple-topped quartz arenite. Using Re–Os dating, this member roughly correlates to the Snail Spring Formation.
- Stromatolite Carbonate Member: This member, which ranges between 160–320 m (520–1,050 ft) in thickness, is predominately composed of stromatolitic dolostone, with inter-bedded inter-clast grainstone and mudstone throughout, which themselves contain rip-up clasts and breccia units. Dololutite can also be found within the member, and ranges from being parallel-laminated to microbially laminated in nature. Using Re–Os dating, this member roughly correlates to the Ram Head Formation. This member is also notably fossiliferous in nature.
- Upper Carbonate Member: This member, which ranges between 110–380 m (360–1,250 ft) in thickness, is primarily composed of black calcareous shale, which is nodular in nature in its lower sections, and is overlain by thin-bedded sandy-quartz. The upper section of the member sees the shales and sandy-quartz give way to thick, inter-bedded stromatolitic dolostone and cross-bedded intra-clast grainstone, with cross-bedded quartz–arenite and microbially laminated lime mudstone found throughout. Using Re–Os dating, this member roughly correlates to the upper Ram Head Formation.

== Dating ==
Using Re–Os geochronology on black shale layers within the Wynniatt Formation, a large date range was recovered. Samples from the lower sections of the formation yielded a date of 849±48 Ma, whilst samples from near the middle of the formation yielded a date of 761±41 Ma, restricting the age of deposition for the formation between 849 Ma and 761 Ma.

== Palaeoenvironments ==
Due to the large thickness of the Wynniatt Formation and its informal members, it also has a notably wide range of environments, mostly shallow in nature, inferred from the rocks and minerals found within each member, which are as follows, based on Rainbird et al., 1996:

- Lower Carbonate Member: This member is inferred to be a periodically exposed inter-tidal mudflat.
- Black Shale Member: This member is inferred to that of a shallow marine environment, which was sub-tidal to inter-tidal in nature with layers of microbial mat.
- Stromatolite Carbonate Member: This member is inferred to have been an extensive shelf-marginal reef complex, which itself is overlain by deposits of lagoons and a back-reef algal flat.
- Upper Carbonate Member: This member is inferred to have undergone cycles of shallow sub-tidal to inter-tidal.

== Taphonomy ==
The Wynniatt Formation is unique in that it has a Burgess Shale-type preservation, with organisms being preserved as carbonaceous films on the surface of a rock. Notably, this would mean that if there were any metazoan organisms present at the time, they too would have been preserved, as seen by the many animal fossils in younger BST sites, such as the Burgess Shale, but only various unicellular and multicellular algae forms have been preserved in the Wynniatt Formation, suggesting there were metazoans had not evolved by 800 Ma, and giving a possible soft maximum age for their appearance.

== Paleobiota ==
The Wynniatt Formation contains a small collection of algae-like fossils dating back to the Tonian, ranging from the classic Tawuia, to enigmatic forms such as Osculosphaera, and the fungi-like Tappania.

Color key: Taxon / Reclassified taxon / Taxon falsely reported as present / Dubious taxon or junior synonym / Ichnotaxon / Ootaxon / Morphotaxon

Notes
Uncertain or tentative taxa are in small text
~~crossed out~~ taxa are discredited.

Genus	Species	Notes	Images
Cheilofilum	C. hysteriopsis	Enigmatic 1.2mm long filamentous organism.	
Chuaria	Chuaria sp.	Enigmatic fossil, possibly synonymous with Tawuia.	Specimen from China
Clavitrichoides	Clavitrichoides sp.	Enigmatic filamentous organism, most material from this formation are possibly less well preserved Cheilofilum.	
Osculosphaera	Osculosphaera sp.	Enigmatic filamentous organism.	
Plicatosphaeridium	P. impostor	Enigmatic filamentous organism.	
Tappania	Tappania sp.	Acanthomorph acritarch, with probable affinities to fungi.	
Tawuia	Tawuia sp.	Enigmatic fossil, possibly an alga.	
Siphonophycus	Siphonophycus sp.	Cyanobacterium.	Line drawing reconstruction of Siphonophycus attenuatum
Ostiana (?)	Ostiana (?) sp.	Spheroid cyanobacterium, possibly either Ostiana or Palaeastrum, although study refers to them as Ostiana.	

== See also ==
- List of fossiliferous stratigraphic units in Nunavut
