= Goose Fiord Formation =

Geologic formation in Nunavut, Canada

- Formation
- Coordinates: 76.6°N 88.5°W
- Location: Nunavut, Canada
- Age: Silurian/Devonian

Dimensions
  - Depth: 308 metres (1,010 ft)

The Goose Fiord Formation is a geologic formation in Nunavut, Canada. It preserves fossils that date back to the Silurian period. It is located on the southern portion of the Ellesmere Island in Canada. It also lies on the northern portion of Devon Island.

== Composition ==
The depth of the fiord reaches nearly 308 meters. The fiord is composed largely of dolomite, whose density peaks inside the bottom 60 meters. The other major component of the fiord is siltstone.

== Location ==
The fiord is exposed along the Schei Syncline, which is on the southern portion of the island. The fiord cannot be seen from the northern portion of Ellesmere Island. It remains on top of the Devon Island Formation, and the Blue Fiord Formation overlies the Goose Formation.

== See also ==
- Blue Fiord Formation
- Devon Island Formation
- Fiord
- List of fossiliferous stratigraphic units in Nunavut
