= List of fossiliferous stratigraphic units in Nunavut =

This is a list of fossiliferous stratigraphic units in Nunavut, Canada.

Group or formation	Period	Notes
Allen Bay Formation	Silurian	
Assistance Formation	Permian	
Attawapiskat Formation	Silurian	
Ayles Formation	Ordovician	
Baillarge Formation	Ordovician	
Barlow Inlet Formation	Silurian	
Bathurst Island Formation	Devonian, Silurian	
Bathurst Group/Heiberg Formation	Triassic	
Belcher Channel Formation	Permian, Carboniferous	
Bird Fiord Formation	Devonian	
Bjorne Formation	Triassic	
Blaa Mountain Formation	Triassic	
Blind Fiord Formation	Triassic	
Blue Fiord Formation	Devonian	
Canyon Fiord Formation	Carboniferous	
Cape Discovery Formation	Ordovician	
Cape Phillips Formation	Devonian, Silurian	
Cape Rawson Formation	Ordovician, Devonian	
Challenger Group/Zebra Cliffs Formation	Ordovician	
Christopher Formation	Cretaceous	
Dana Bay Formation	Permian	
Deer Bay Formation	Cretaceous	
Degerböls Formation	Permian	
Disappointment Bay Formation	Devonian	
Douro Formation	Silurian	
Eids Fiord Formation	Devonian	
Eureka Sound Formation	Paleogene	
Eureka Sound Group/Buchanan Lake Formation	Paleogene	
Feilden Formation	Permian	
Great Bear Cape Formation	Permian	
Goose Fiord Formation	Silurian, Devonian	
Hare Fiord Formation	Permian, Carboniferous	
Hecla Bay Formation	Devonian	
Heiberg Formation	Triassic	
Imina Formation	Silurian	
Isachsen Formation	Cretaceous	
Jaeger Formation	Jurassic	
Kanguk Formation	Cretaceous	
Kidluit Formation	Pleistocene	
Kittigazuit Formation	Pleistocene	
Leopold Formation	Silurian	
M'Clintock Formation	Ordovician	
Marvin Formation	Silurian	
Nansen Formation	Permian, Carboniferous	
Okse Bay Formation / Fram Formation	Devonian	
Otto Fiord Formation	Carboniferous	
Pavy Formation	Paleogene	
Peel Sound Formation	Silurian	
Raanes Formation	Permian	
Read Bay Formation	Silurian	
Sabine Bay Formation	Permian	
Schei Point Formation	Triassic	
Somerset Island Formation	Silurian	
Stuart Bay Formation	Devonian	
Sunderland River Formation	Devonian	
Taconite River Formation	Ordovician	
Tanquary Formation	Permian	
Trappers Cove Formation	Permian	
Trold Fiord Formation	Permian	
Van Hauen Formation	Permian	
Weatherall Formation	Devonian	
Wynniatt Formation	Tonian	
Zebra Cliffs Formation	Ordovician	
