= Delorme Formation =

Stratigraphic unit in Northwest Territories, Canada

- Stratigraphic range: Silurian
- Type: Formation

Location
- Region: Northwest Territories
- Country: Canada

The Delorme Formation is a geologic formation in Northwest Territories. It preserves fossils dating back to the Silurian period.

== See also ==
- List of fossiliferous stratigraphic units in Northwest Territories
