= Funeral Formation =

Stratigraphic Unit in Northwest Territories, Canada

- Stratigraphic range: Devonian
- Type: Formation

Location
- Region: Northwest Territories
- Country: Canada

The Funeral Formation is a geologic formation in Northwest Territories, Canada. It preserves fossils dating back to the Devonian period.

== See also ==
- List of fossiliferous stratigraphic units in Northwest Territories
