= Kittigazuit Formation =

Geologic formation in Nunavut, Canada

- Stratigraphic range: Late Wisconsin
- Type: Formation

Location
- Region: Nunavut
- Country: Canada

The Kittigazuit Formation is a Pleistocene geologic formation in Nunavut. It preserves fossils such as moss, pine needles and beetles.

== See also ==
- List of fossiliferous stratigraphic units in Nunavut
