= Marvin Formation =

Geologic formation in Nunavut, Canada

- Stratigraphic range: Silurian
- Type: Formation

Location
- Region: Nunavut
- Country: Canada

The Marvin Formation is a geologic formation in Nunavut. It preserves fossils dating back to the Silurian period.

== See also ==
- List of fossiliferous stratigraphic units in Nunavut
