= Husky Formation =

- Stratigraphic range: Jurassic
- Type: Formation

Location
- Region: Yukon
- Country: Canada

The Husky Formation is a fossiliferous stratigraphic geological formation located in the Aklavik Range, in the District of Mackenzie, Yukon.

Regional Geology

The Husky formation is a part of a larger, Jurassic aged sedimentary package that spans from Northern Yukon to the Northwest Territories. This package is a regional wedge concentrated in the Richardson Mountains, that sits atop North American Cordillera basement rocks. The wedge demonstrates classic basin-ward thickening. Associated with this thickening is a stratigraphic range from coarser, lower to middle-Jurassic sedimentary units to upper-Jurassic shale, which marks the Husky formation. The Husky formation is one of the two shale units in the Aklavik range, and is characterized by its fossil assemblages. The “Husky shale” lies immediately above the bivalve rich, heavily bioturbated Aklavik sandstone. The “Husky shale” is one of the youngest units (second youngest to the Porcupine River formation) in this wedge-succession and marks an unconformity with the Aklavic sandstone units below.

Fossils in The Husky Formation

The Husky succession preserves fossils dating back to the Upper Jurassic (Oxfordian-Volgian) period including foraminifera, bivalves, ostracods and ammonites. provide environmental proxies related to paleoclimatic reconstructions during the deposition of The Husky Formation.

Placement of stratigraphic markers between Upper and Middle Jurassic sections along The Husky Succession have been debated. Biostratigraphic analysis of foraminifers as index fossils and lithostratigraphic analysis of sedimentary layers indicated suitable placement of a GGSP between The Porcupine River Formation and the Aklavik Formation in the upper Oxfordian Jurassic period. Foraminifera are protists classified as a sub-phylum of Domain Eukarya and have been preserved in The Husky Formation. Foraminifera are free-living heterotrophic marine organisms suggesting the Aklavik Range was a marine environment during the Jurassic.

Bivalves including clams, scallops and mussels were discovered in The Husky Formation. Bivalves are a sub-category of Class Bivalvia and Phylum Mollusca. Marine, freshwater and terrestrial specimens are common. Characteristics of Mollusca include bilateral symmetry, non-segmented cephalization, complete digestive tract, triploblastic and a reduced coelom. Distinguishing characteristics of Class Bivalvia include a greatly reduced head, laterally compressed foot and a laterally compressed body and shell forcing the mantle to overhang the body. These defining characteristics represent adaptions for burrowing in a soft substrate, which explains the presence of bivalves in soft sediment along the Husky Formation. Not all modern day bivalves are soft bottom dwellers, as much diversity has occurred within the class due to adaptions necessary for survival suggesting depositional environment has changed in the Northern Yukon since the Jurassic.

Ammonites are also a part of Phylum Mollusca as Class Cephalopoda, Order Nautilida. Ammonites have well-developed shells that have been preserved as fossils that provide further evidence of a marine environment during deposition of The Husky Formation. A marine environment was essential for cephalopods as their characteristics represented adaptations for a swimming, predatory mode of existence. Contraction of the mantle pushes out water from the mantle cavity causing propulsion for swimming.

Ostracods are a part of Phylum Arthropoda as Class Crustacea. Ostracods are limited to damp environments due to gas exchange using gills, but primarily inhabit aquatic environments which is further evidence supporting a marine environment during the Jurassic in Northern Yukon.

== See also ==
- List of fossiliferous stratigraphic units in Yukon
