= Taconite River Formation =

Geologic formation in Nunavut, Canada

- Stratigraphic range: Ordovician
- Type: Formation

Location
- Region: Nunavut
- Country: Canada

The Taconite River Formation is a geologic formation in Nunavut, Canada. It preserves fossils dating back to the Ordovician period.

== See also ==
- List of fossiliferous stratigraphic units in Nunavut
