= Loon River Formation =

Geologic group in Canada

- Stratigraphic range: Cretaceous
- Type: Formation

Location
- Region: Northwest Territories
- Country: Canada

The Loon River Formation is a geologic formation in Northwest Territories. It preserves fossils dating back to the Cretaceous period.

== See also ==
- List of fossiliferous stratigraphic units in Northwest Territories
