= Challenger Group =

Geologic group in Nunavut, Canada

- Stratigraphic range: Ordovician
- Type: Group

Location
- Region: Nunavut
- Country: Canada

The Challenger Group is a geologic group in Nunavut. It preserves fossils dating back to the Ordovician period.

== See also ==
- List of fossiliferous stratigraphic units in Nunavut
