= Sheepbed Formation =

Geologic formation in Canada

- Stratigraphic range: Ediacaran 632.6 Ma
- Type: Formation
- Unit of: Rackla Group
- Sub-units: Lower and Upper Member
- Underlies: Nadaleen Formation
- Overlies: Cliff Creek Formation
- Thickness: 400 metres (1,300 ft)

Lithology
- Primary: Shale
- Other: Dolostone

Location
- Region: Northwest Territories
- Country: Canada

The Sheepbed Formation is a geologic formation in the Northwest Territories of Canada, which is dominated by shale desposits, and capped by a layer of dolostone.

== History ==
In 1989, a paper by James D. Aitken was published describing the discovery of the fossil genus Kullingia in the then 'Upper-most Sheepbed Formation'. Further discoveries were made a year later in 1990 by Guy M. Narbonne and Aitken, ranging from Charniodiscus to Sekwia.

Although in 2013 and 2014, studies found that this fossiliferous unit was in fact not a part of the Sheepbed Formation, due to the coarser nature of the shales, and is separated from the Sheepbed Formation by major regional sequence boundary, marked by large channel fills. As such, it is noted this strata, previously referred to as the "June Beds" and now formally known as the Nadaleen Formation, is younger in age than the Sheepbed Formation. As such, there are currently no known fossils from within Sheepbed.

== See also ==
- List of fossiliferous stratigraphic units in Northwest Territories
