= Kidluit Formation =

Geologic formation in Nunavut, Canada

- Stratigraphic range: Early-Late Wisconsin
- Type: Formation

Location
- Region: Nunavut
- Country: Canada

The Kidluit Formation is a Pleistocene geologic formation in Nunavut. It preserves fossils such as weevils and bulrush achenes.

== See also ==
- List of fossiliferous stratigraphic units in Nunavut
