= Boas River Formation =

Geologic formation in the Northwest Territories, Canada

- Stratigraphic range: Ordovician
- Type: Formation

Location
- Region: Northwest Territories
- Country: Canada

The Boas River Formation is a geologic formation in Northwest Territories. It preserves fossils dating back to the Ordovician period.

== See also ==
- List of fossiliferous stratigraphic units in the Northwest Territories
