= Rat River Formation =

Geologic formation in the Northwest Territories, Canada

- Stratigraphic range: Aptian; ~120–112 Ma
- Type: Formation

Location
- Region: Northwest Territories
- Country: Canada

The Rat River Formation is a geologic formation in Northwest Territories. It preserves fossils dating back to the Cretaceous period.

== See also ==
- List of fossiliferous stratigraphic units in Northwest Territories
