= Eureka Sound Formation =

Geologic formation in Nunavut, Canada

- Stratigraphic range: Paleogene
- Type: Formation

Location
- Region: Nunavut
- Country: Canada

The Eureka Sound Formation is a geologic formation found in the Canadian Territory of Nunavut on Ellesmere Island, which is part of the Canadian Arctic Archipelago. The Eureka Sound Formation is Tertiary in age.

== History ==
During the early Tertiary period, marine beds began forming in the Eureka Sound Formation within an area that was previously thought to be almost exclusively non-marine. This discovery indicates that this region of the Arctic had been mild, temperate, and ice-free during the early to middle Eocene, despite being well above the Arctic Circle. As of May 2014, this discovery had been restricted to the easternmost regions of the Canadian Arctic on Ellesmere Island. Because the Eureka Sound Formation contains the largest accumulation of Arctic Paleogene deposits, studying its marine deposits is key in gaining a better understanding of the early Tertiary history of the Arctic Ocean.

== Fossils ==
Some fossils discovered in the Eureka Sound Formation were Paleogene land vertebrates that include fish, turtles, and several types of mammals. Other types of fossils found were reptilian species and several types of birds. Fresh water molluscs were also found.

== Sediments and geology ==
On Southern Ellesmere Island, the Eureka Sound Formation is up to 480 meters thick and consists of a sequence of predominantly non-marine sandstones, mudstones, coal and minor siltstones. Sandstone petrography and heavy mineral analyses indicate that the Eureka Sound sediments were derived mainly from Precambrian granulite-grade metamorphic rocks of the Canadian Shield located to the southeast of the Formation. Another finding states that significant amounts of the rocks of the Eureka Sound Formation on Western Ellesmere Island are marine in origin.

== See also ==
- List of fossiliferous stratigraphic units in Nunavut
