= Ettrain Formation =

Geologic formation in Yukon, Canada

- Stratigraphic range: Carboniferous
- Type: Formation

Location
- Region: Yukon
- Country: Canada

The Ettrain Formation is a geologic formation in Yukon. It preserves fossils dating back to the Carboniferous period.

== See also ==
- List of fossiliferous stratigraphic units in Yukon
