= Jungle Creek Formation =

Geologic formation in Yukon, Canada

- Stratigraphic range: Permian
- Type: Formation

Location
- Region: Yukon
- Country: Canada

The Jungle Creek Formation is a geologic formation in Yukon. It preserves fossils dating back to the Permian period.

== See also ==
- List of fossiliferous stratigraphic units in Yukon
