= North Branch Formation =

Canadian geologic formation

- Stratigraphic range: Cretaceous
- Type: Formation

Location
- Region: Yukon
- Country: Canada

The North Branch Formation is a geologic formation in Yukon. It preserves fossils dating back to the Cretaceous period.

== See also ==
- List of fossiliferous stratigraphic units in Yukon
