= Bear Rock =

- Stratigraphic range: 422.9 - 385.3 ma
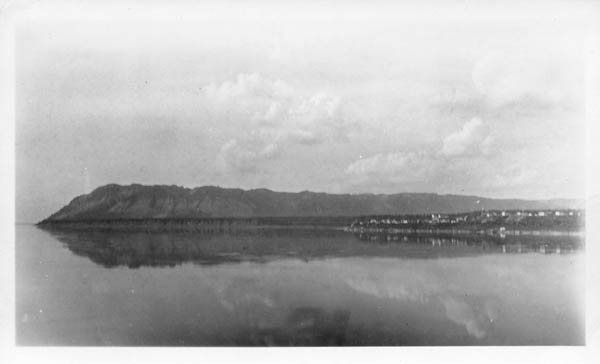
- The Bear Rock outcropping is about ten kilometers north of the mouth of the Great Bear River, NW of Tulita, NWT.
- Type: Formation

Location
- Coordinates: 64°58′0″N 125°43′22″W
- Region: Northwest Territories
- Country: Canada
- Bear Rock (Northwest Territories) Location of Bear Rock in the Northwest Territories

Bear Rock (Dene: Kweteniɂaá) is a geologic formation in the Sahtu Region of the Northwest Territories located across the mouth of the Great Bear River from Tulita.

== Geology ==
Bear Rock is a lithostratigraphic sedimentary outcropping composed primarily of gypsum, dolomite, limestone, and breccia laid down in the Late Silurian to Middle Devonian (422.9 - 385.3 ma) periods. It is a site of karst features including caves and sinkholes, including one that was featured on Fodor's "15 of Canada's Most Stunning Natural Wonders" list. Marine fossils including acanthodians, brachiopods and corals have been found here.

== Folklore ==
Bear Rock is said to be the rock over which a mythical hero, known to various Dene groups as either Yamoria, Yamozah, or Zhamba Dezha, stretched the skins of giant beavers after he had slain them to stop them from terrorizing the people. It has been a traditional place of prayer and reflection for these indigenous people for generations.

== 2019 landslide ==
In May 2019, following damage from a forest fire a few months earlier, a major landslide occurred on the north slope which scarred the landscape and covered the entrances to several caves.

== See also ==
- List of fossiliferous stratigraphic units in Northwest Territories
