= Okse Bay =

Bay in Nunavut, Canada

- Location within Nunavut
- Location: Norwegian Bay
- Coordinates: 77°07′N 87°30′W
- Ocean/sea sources: Arctic Ocean
- Basin countries: Canada
- Settlements: Uninhabited

Okse Bay is an Arctic waterway in the Qikiqtaaluk Region, Nunavut, Canada. It is located in Norwegian Bay by southwestern Ellesmere Island, east of Buckingham Island.

== Geology ==
The thick series of strata at Okse Bay, characterized by sandstones, mudstones, and shale, are referred to as the Okse Bay Formation.
