= Illtyd Formation =

Geologic formation in Yukon, Canada

- Stratigraphic range: Cambrian
- Type: Formation
- Underlies: Slats Creek Fm

Location
- Region: Yukon
- Country: Canada

The Illtyd Formation is an up to 1000-m thick geologic formation in Yukon. It preserves fossils dating back to the Dyerian subdivision of the Cambrian period, which spans the Stage 3 / Stage 4 boundary; it's considered to belong to the mid-upper Bonnia-Olenellus trilobite Zone. Top of the unit corresponds, more or less, to the top of Stage 4. These fossils include Lower Cambrian trilobites'.

The type section is in the Wernecke Mtns; it corps out also in and to the S/SW of the Rochardson Moutnars. It possibly corresponds to the Sekwi Fm in the Macxkenzie mtns.

Lowermost of the Palaeozoic strata west of the Richardson Mountains, angular unconformity at base, overlying various Precambrian strata. Silty limestones and massive dolomites. In places rhythmically bedded. Colour: Tan, brownish grey muds; sandier layers orange. Upper layers include oolites and oncolites. Trace fossils include burrows and 'worm trails'. In some places unit is massively faulted and altered / weathered, approaching marble grade metamorphism near faults.

== See also ==
- List of fossiliferous stratigraphic units in Yukon
