= Sabine Bay Formation =

Geologic formation in Nunavut, Canada

- Stratigraphic range: Early Permian (Kungurian)
- Type: Formation

Location
- Region: Nunavut
- Country: Canada

The Sabine Bay Formation is a geologic formation in Nunavut. It preserves fossils dating back to the Early Permian period.

== Stratigraphic importance ==
In 2009, fossil fauna of Sabine Bay Formation was used to confirm the invalidity of the Ufimian stage in the Russian geologic time scale. Conodonts Mesogondolella idahoensis and ammonoids Epijuresanites from upper part of this formation are typical for Upper Kungurian stage, while Mesogondolella gracilis and ammonoids Sverdrupites harkeri from the overlying Assistance Formation are characteristic of the Roadian (Kazanian) stage. Such correspondence to the stages completely excludes the presence of a "gap" between Sabine Bay and Assistance Formations for an additional Ufimian stage.

== See also ==
- List of fossiliferous stratigraphic units in Nunavut
