= Ship Point Formation =

Geologic group in Canada

- Stratigraphic range: Ordovician
- Type: Formation

Location
- Region: Northwest Territories
- Country: Canada

The Ship Point Formation is a geologic formation in Northwest Territories. It preserves fossils dating back to the Ordovician period.

== See also ==
- List of fossiliferous stratigraphic units in Northwest Territories
