= Aksala Formation =

Geologic formation in Yukon, Canada

- Stratigraphic range: Triassic
- Type: Formation

Location
- Region: Yukon
- Country: Canada

The Aksala Formation is a geologic formation in Yukon. It preserves fossils dating back to the Triassic period.

The fossils found include sea urchins such as Triassicidaris peruviensis.

== See also ==
- List of fossiliferous stratigraphic units in Yukon
