= Hare Indian Formation =

Geologic formation in Canada

- Stratigraphic range: Devonian
- Type: Formation

Location
- Region: Northwest Territories
- Country: Canada

The Hare Indian Formation is a geologic formation in Northwest Territories. It preserves fossils dating back to the Devonian period.

== See also ==
- List of fossiliferous stratigraphic units in Northwest Territories
