= Dana Bay Formation =

Geologic formation in Nunavut

- Stratigraphic range: Permian
- Type: Formation

Location
- Region: Nunavut
- Country: Canada

The Dana Bay Formation is a geologic formation in Nunavut. It preserves fossils dating back to the Permian period.

== See also ==
- List of fossiliferous stratigraphic units in Nunavut
