= Okse Bay Group =

Geologic group in Northwest Territories, Canada

- Stratigraphic range: Devonian
- Type: Group

Location
- Region: Northwest Territories
- Country: Canada

The Okse Bay Group is a geologic group in Northwest Territories. It preserves fossils dating back to the Devonian period.

== See also ==
- List of fossiliferous stratigraphic units in Northwest Territories
