= Bird Fiord Formation =

Geologic formation in Nunavut, Canada

- Stratigraphic range: Devonian
- Type: Formation

Location
- Region: Nunavut
- Country: Canada

The Bird Fiord Formation is a geologic formation in Nunavut. It preserves fossils dating back to the Devonian period.

== Fossil content ==
Vertebrates
Genus	Species	Presence	Notes	Images
Ellopetalichthys	E. scheii	Baad Fiord Member	A petalichthyid placoderm	

Brachiopods
Genus	Species	Presence	Material	Images
Cranaena	C. briceae	Baad Fiord Member	Holotype (UA12976), paratypes (UA12975, UA12977 and UA12978) and 303 other specimens.	
Desquamatia	D. (Independatrypa) fortis	Baad Fiord and Blubber Point members	Holotype (UA12956), paratypes (UA12951, UA12957, UA12953, UA12952, UA12954 and UA12955) and 8,538 other specimens.	
Gypidula	G. mega	Baad Fiord Member	Holotype (UA12937), paratypes (UA12933, UA12934, UA12935, UA12936, UA12938, UA12939) and 42 other specimens.	
Nucleospira	N. lens	Baad Fiord, Blubber Point and Norwegian Bay members	645 specimens	
Nucleospira	N. stelcki	Baad Fiord, Blubber Point and Cardigan Strait members	Holotype (UA12966), paratypes (UA12963, UA13964 and UA12965) and 103 other specimens	
Parapholidostrophia?	P.? sp.	Baad Member	Known from "30 complete or nearly complete specimens, 2 ventriloquism interiors"	
Spinatrypa	S. (Isospinatrypa) parva	Baad Fiord and Blubber Point Members	Holotype (UA12941), paratypes (UA12940 and UA12942-12945) and 106 other specimens.	
Spinatrypina	S. borealis	Baad Fiord, Blubber Point and Norwegian Bay members	8,178 specimens	
Spinulicosta?	S.? sp.	Baad Fiord, Cardigan Strait, Blubber Point, and Norwegian Bay Members	"1392 specimens, most incomplete"	
Warrenella	W. grinnellensis	Baad Fiord and Blubber Point members.	Holotype (UA12970), paratypes (UA12967-UA12972) and 1,610 other specimens.	

== See also ==
- List of fossiliferous stratigraphic units in Nunavut
