= Francis X. Pavy =

American painter and sculptor

Francis X. Pavy (born March 2, 1954) is a Cajun American painter and sculptor. His work has been exhibited in New York City, New Orleans, Louisiana, Houston, Texas, Los Angeles, California, France, and Switzerland.

== Early life ==
Pavy was born in Lafayette, Louisiana on March 2, 1954. In his youth, he studied under the visual artist Elemore Morgan, Jr. He attended the University of Southwestern Louisiana, where he studied music, ceramics, animation, painting, printmaking and sculpture. In 1976, he graduated with a Bachelor of Fine Arts degree in sculpture.

== Art ==
Pavy's art is strongly influenced by his Cajun heritage and the mythology and storytelling of the Southern U.S. His work features recognizable Louisianan archetypes, such as zydeco instruments and rural Southern architecture—art critic Calvin Harland described him as "one of the very few artists of a...Cajun Heritage to have made in-depth use of his native source material." He melds these archetypes with sophisticated patterning for a psychedelic effect.

Pavy paints on canvas and paper. He also paints on "constructions," simple sculptures of wood, plastic, and found objects that give his paintings three-dimensionality.

In Spring 2011, the Acadiana Center for the Arts in Lafayette, Louisiana honored Pavy with a retrospective of his 35-year career.

== Trivia ==
Lorne Michaels owns a print of Pavy's painting, Zydeco Blues, and hangs it in his office. As a result, the print can frequently be seen on Saturday Night Live.
