= Ingta Formation =

- Stratigraphic range: Ediacaran–Lower Cambrian (?)
- Type: Geological formation
- Thickness: up to 312 metres (1,020 ft)

Lithology
- Primary: Interbedded Shale & Sandstone
- Other: Subordinate limestone units

Location
- Country: Canada

The Ingta Formation is a geological unit containing green sandstones and shales; it crops out in the Canadian Mackenzie Mountains. Its age is poorly constrained, though it straddles the Precambrian/Cambrian boundary. Below the boundary its ichnofauna comprises subhorizontal Planolites burrows; above it, Phycodes burrows immediately appear, with Nemakit-Daldyn SSFs appearing soon after.

== Stratigraphy ==
The formation is overlain by either the Backbone Ranges Formation and the Vampire Formation, depending on the locality. These two formations have a common base with the Ingta formation, and both continue onwards until the base of the Sekwi Formation.

== Depositional environment ==
The rocks are submarine, and were deposited in a nearshore to offshore location on the continental shelf, with no freshwater influence evident—although overlying units bear evidence of deltaic and braided river deposits.

== Palaeontology ==
The formation has yielded a range of SSFs including eggs and embryos, anabaritids, Protohertzina, Zhejiangorhabdion, and phosphatized tubes, spines and plates.
