= Tappania =

Tappania Temporal range: 1630-550 Ma

Scientific classification
- Domain: Eukaryota
- (unranked): Acritarcha
- Genus: Tappania Yin, 1997

Species
- Tappania plana

Tappania is an acanthomorph acritarch found in late Paleoproterozoic, Mesoproterozoic and Neoproterozoic rocks. The oldest examples are around 1630 million years old, making them some of the oldest known evidence of Eukaryotes in the fossil record.

- Tappania plana appears in Paleoproterozoic formations of India (Deonar) and northern China (Baicaoping and Beidajian), both with an age of 1,630 mya. It is a roughly spherical acritarch, 30-60 μm in diameter, with one or two small necks. Small branched and / or partitioned tubes emerge from the central body.
- Tappania sp. It appears in deposits of the Neoproterozoic in northern Australia, northwestern US and central Siberia, with an age of up to 850 mya and 200-300 mya stratigraphic presence. It is larger than Tappania plana, up to 300 μm in length, with an elongated or lobed central body from where hyphae-like tubular extensions radiate. These hyphae form a three-dimensional network around the central body.
