= Vampire Formation =

- Stratigraphic range: Cambrian
- Type: Geological formation
- Underlies: Sekwi Formation
- Overlies: Ingta Formation
- Thickness: up to

Location
- Location: Mackenzie Mountains
- Region: Northwest Territories
- Country: Canada

The Vampire Formation is a formation of delta-front siliciclastics deposited in the early Cambrian. The upper unit is trilobitic Cambrian. Some authors place the underlying Ingta formation at least partially in the Cambrian; in places it overlies the sub-Cambrian unconformity.

It contains a rich array of trace fossils spanning the pre-trilobitic Cambrian, including some found only there (once interpreted as sponge-like forms); its uppermost strata contain Fallotaspis-zone trilobites, whereas its lower levels come above Protohertzina and Anabarites-bearing shelly layers in the Ingta formation; as such, it spans much of the Fortunian.
