= Sunblood Formation =

Geologic formation in Northwest Territories

- Stratigraphic range: Ordovician
- Type: Formation
- Overlies: Rabbitkettle Formation and others

Location
- Region: Northwest Territories
- Country: Canada

The Sunblood Formation is a geologic formation in Northwest Territories. It preserves fossils dating back to the Ordovician period. It comprises dolomite, sandstones and limestones, locally silty (giving rise to a vivid colouration through weathering).

== See also ==
- List of fossiliferous stratigraphic units in Northwest Territories
