= Pavy Formation =

Geological formation in Nunavut, Canada

- Stratigraphic range: Thanetian
- Type: Formation

Lithology
- Primary: Siltstone
- Other: Coal

Location
- Coordinates: 81.7°N 64.4°W
- Approximate paleocoordinates: 74.3°N 13.3°W
- Region: Ellesmere Island, Nunavut
- Country: Canada
- Extent: Sverdrup Basin

Type section
- Named for: Pavy River
- Pavy Formation (Canada) Pavy Formation (Nunavut)

The Pavy Formation is a geologic formation in Nunavut. It preserves fossil insects of Carabites feildenianus, dating back to the Thanetian stage of the Paleocene period.

== Description ==
The Pavy Formation is interpreted to be fluvial in origin. Trough-crossbedded sandstone facies dominate this formation and were probably channel deposits of a braided river system, with interbeds of siltstone and mudrock representing floodplain deposits. Where thicker intervals of mudrock occur, backswamp ponds or shallow-lake conditions were probably present. Only at Watercourse Valley and Pavy River did conditions stabilize long enough for swamps to develop, producing thick coal beds.

== See also ==
- List of fossiliferous stratigraphic units in Nunavut
  - Margaret Formation
