= Okse Bay Formation =

Upper Devonian formation in Northern Canada

Oske Bay Formation
- Stratigraphic range: 397.5–359.2 Ma
- Type: Group
- Sub-units: Strathcona Fiord, Hecla Bay, Fram, Hell Gate and Nordstrand Point
- Underlies: Parry Islands Formation
- Overlies: Blue Fiord Formation
- Thickness: Approximately 10,000'

Lithology
- Primary: Shale
- Other: Sandstone, Siltstone coal

Location
- Region: Nunavut
- Country: Canada

Type section
- Named for: Okse Bay
- Named by: McLaren, 1963

Geologic group in Canadian Arctic

The Okse Bay Formation or Group is a Middle to Upper Devonian formation found in Okse Bay area, on Ellesmere Island in Nunavut, Canada. The formation contains many plant fossils, and fish fossils. With evident cross-bedding and thin coal layers this formation has been described as being deposited in a deltaic environment.

== Stratigraphy ==
Okse Bay Group contains five main formations Strathcona Fiord Formation, Hecla Bay Formation, Fram Formation, Hell Gate Formation and Nordstrand Point Formation. The Okse Bay is made up primary of shale and very fine grained sandstone, with siltstone and coal also present in small amounts. The deposition period of the Okse Bay represents a time during the Innuitian orogeny (Ellesmerian Orogeny) where depositional material was derived manly from the east from Ellesmere Island-Greenland craton.

The Nordstrand Point Formation is the upper most formation in the group. It is Late Devonian or Frasnian in age. Named by Embry and Klovan, 1976. It is approximately 2,200' thick. The formation is made of alternating layers of sandstone and shale. Sand layers are between ten and fifty feet thick and the shale layers are up to sixty feet thick. The sandstones are up to fine grained with some conglomerate found near the base. The primary lithologies are grey to green shales and siltstones, with occasional red shales near the base.

Below is the Hell Gate Formation. This formation is up to 2,290' feet thick and is made up of mostly white fine to medium grained sandstone, with extensive cross bedding found throughout the formation. Units of shale and siltstone are found throughout the formation. Limited amounts of plant and fish debris are the only fossils found in this formation.

The Fram Formation is made up of shale and siltstone units, with sandstone units bedded between. The shale/siltstone beds are between 20 and 70 feet thick. The lower half of the formation contains mostly red shales while the upper half contains green/grey shales. The sandstone units are 3 to 35 feet thick and fine upwards, with the lower half being fine grained and the upper half being very fine grained. Plant and fish remains can be found throughout the formation.

The Hecla Bay Formation is composed mainly of fine to medium grained sandstones. It also contains minor units of shale, siltstone and thin coal beds.

== Fossils ==
Bothriolepis rex

Onychodus mikijuk
