= Bug Creek Group =

Stratigraphic Group in Northwest Territories, Canada

- Stratigraphic range: Jurassic
- Type: Group

Location
- Region: Northwest Territories
- Country: Canada

The Bug Creek Group is a geologic group in Northwest Territories. It preserves fossils dating back to the Jurassic period.

== See also ==
- List of fossiliferous stratigraphic units in Northwest Territories
