= Sekwi Formation =

- Stratigraphic range: Atdabanian (approx.); Fallotaspis, Nevadella, and Bonnia-Olenellus trilobite zones
- Type: Formation
- Underlies: Hess River Formation; Rockslide Formation
- Overlies: Vampire Formation; Backbone Ranges Formation; Ingta Formation (where the above are absent)
- Thickness: 700 m

Location
- Region: Northwest Territories
- Country: Canada

The Sekwi Formation is a geologic formation in Northwest Territories, Canada, which preserves fossils dating back to the Cambrian period.

The formation principally comprises shallow water carbonates, but deepens to include mid-shelf mudstones, both calcareous and siliciclastic.

It dates from c. 525-510 Ma, the Nevadella / Bonnia-Olenellus trilobite zones.

== See also ==
- List of fossiliferous stratigraphic units in Northwest Territories
