= Christopher Formation =

Geologic formation in Nunavut, Canada

- Stratigraphic range: Aptian
- Type: Formation

Location
- Region: Nunavut
- Country: Canada

The Christopher Formation is a geological formation of early to mid-Cretaceous age exposed in the Sverdrup Basin of the Canadian Arctic Archipelago, including areas such as Axel Heiberg Island. It consists primarily of fine-grained marine sedimentary rocks, especially mudstone and related siliciclastic deposits.

The formation was laid down in a shallow to deeper marine environment along the Arctic continental margin. Its sediments and fossil content indicate deposition in an open-marine setting, with conditions that varied over time in response to changes in sea level, circulation patterns, and regional basin evolution. Microfossils, particularly foraminifera preserved within the formation, have been used to reconstruct its age and paleoenvironment.

== See also ==
- List of fossiliferous stratigraphic units in Nunavut
