= Wernecke Mountains Group =

Wernecke Mountains

Location
- Region: Yukon
- Country: Canada

Type section
- Named for: Livingston Wernecke

The Wernecke Mountains are located in the East-central Yukon Territory of Canada. They have provided important wildlife habitat for animals such as grizzly bears and caribou as well as trapping and hunting land for the indigenous people of the Yukon for many centuries. They are the northernmost expression of the North American Cordillera, a chain of mountains stretching from Alaska to southern Mexico. This area has a northern climate characterized by short summers and long winters, with average temperatures from −26 °C (−15 °F) in the winter to 22 °C (72 °F) in the summer While essentially unpopulated, this area is well known for its rich mineral deposits, including gold, silver and copper.

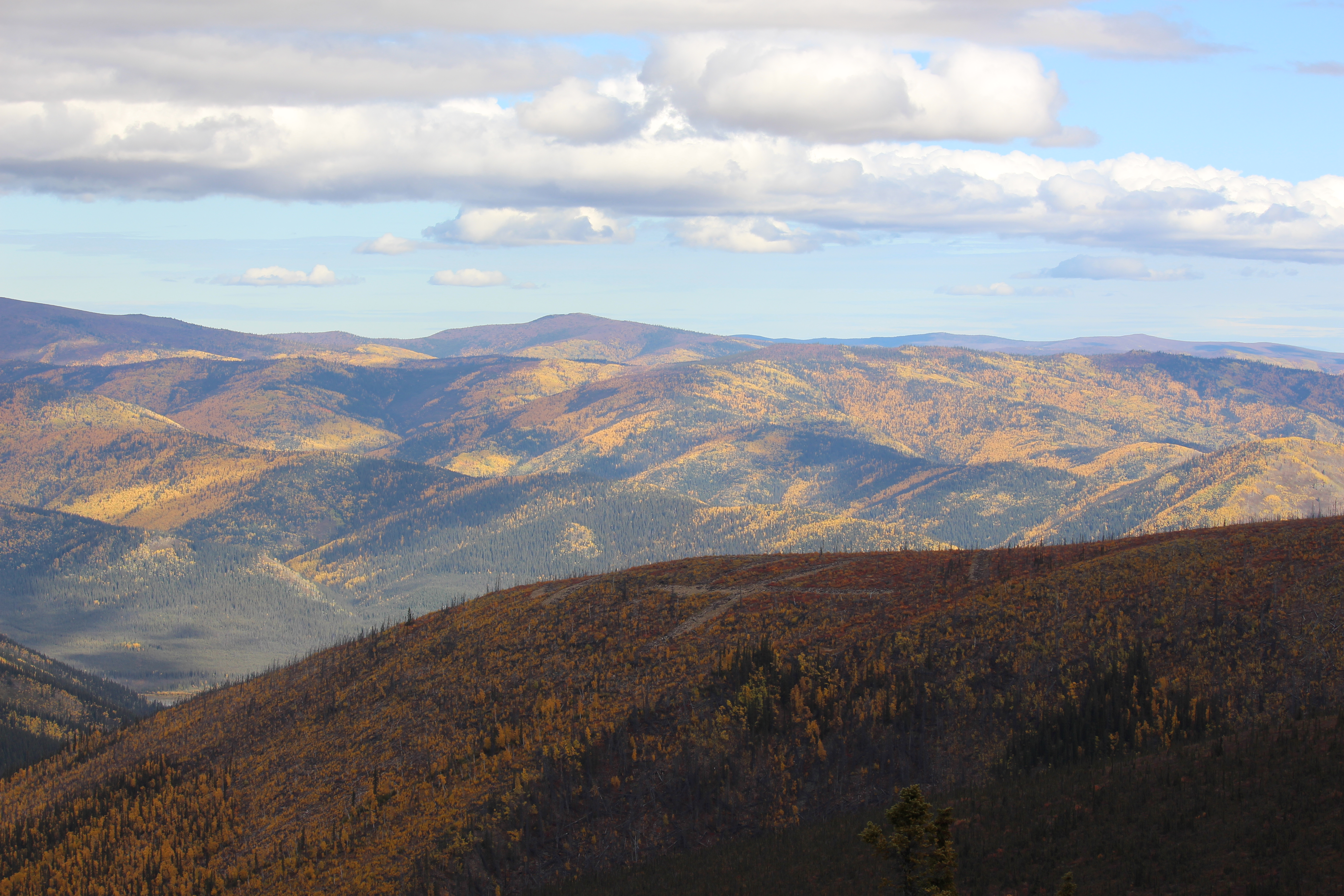
Yukon Wernecke mountains

== Geological Setting ==
In the Proterozic, this area was located on the west coast of ancient North America. The thick sedimentary deposits composed an eastward tapering, supracrustal wedge. At least three cycles of basin formation and extension at the western edge of Laurentia resulted in 22 kilometers of sediment deposited in the early Proterozoic through to the Paleozoic eras. Extension and crustal thinning associated with basin development during the Paleoproterozoic suggests separation of Laurentia from another continent to the west, thought to be ancient eastern Australia. The rifting of cratons produced intracratonic basins and passive margin. Extensional periods were interrupted by orogenies, uplift, magmatism, and hydrothermal activity, ultimately creating the landscape seen today. Thus, the rocks exposed in the Wernecke mountains reveal the events responsible for the early formation of western North America.

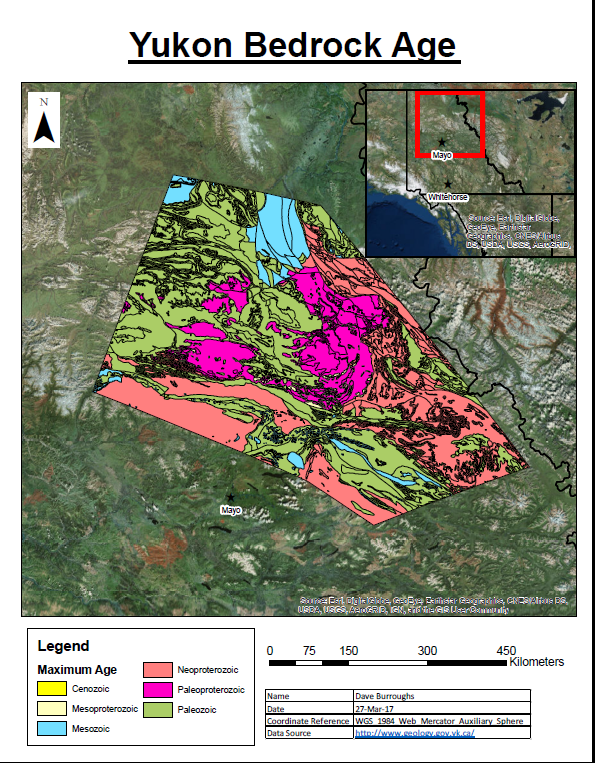

== Crystalline Basement ==
The Yukon's crystalline basement is overlain by thick sedimentary strata deposited in extensional and/or rift basin environments. These basement rocks are not exposed anywhere in the Yukon, and the thickness of the surpracrustal sediments makes surveying using aeromagnetics, a technique used for inferring basement character in NWT, difficult. Hence, the character of the underlying crystalline basement of the Wernecke range is not well-known. Estimates for the age of the basement rock ranges from Archean to early Proterozoic. These rocks are hypothesized to be a thinned continuation of the granitic Fort Simpson terrane exposed to the East based on aeromagnetic and gravity anomalies combined with drill-hole analyses in NWT.

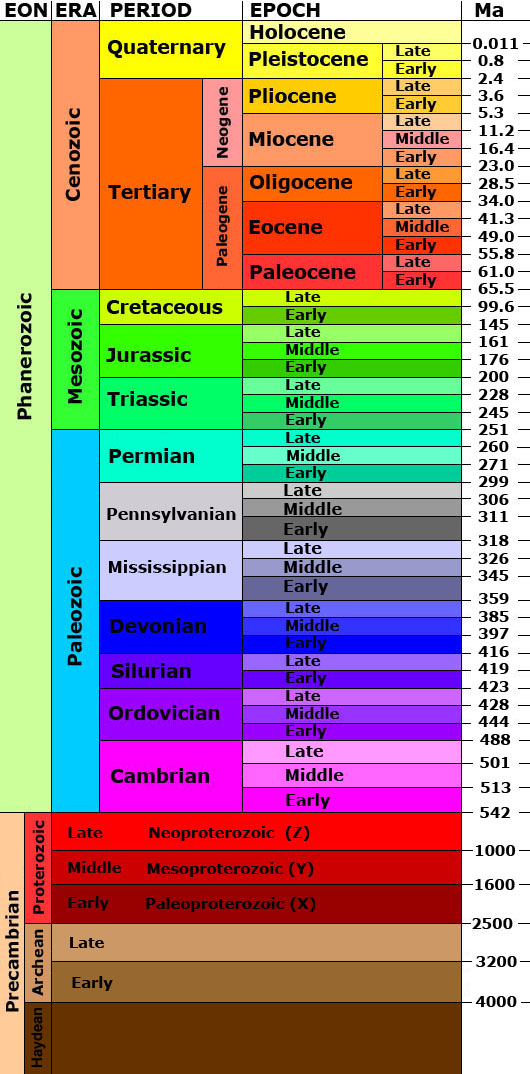
Geologic time scale

== Wernecke Supergroup ==
The Wernecke Supergroup was deposited in the paleoproterozoic from >1.84 Ga - 1.60 Ga. The thickness of the deposits seen in the Wernecke Mountains suggests crustal thinning and extension in passive margin or intracratonal environment. The Wompay orogen has been suggested as a possible mechanism behind the initial formation of the Wernecke basin. This hypothesis is supported by both the timing of the orogeny, approximately 1.88-1.84 Ga, and Nd values in the Wernecke Supergroup consistent with Nd values in rocks involved in the Wompay orogen and the Canadian Shield. The oldest exposed sedimentary deposit in the Wernecke mountains, known as the Wernecke Supergroup, comprises Fairchild Lake Group, the Quartet Group, and the Gillespie Lake Group. Together, these groups represent two cycles of basin subsidence and consequent infilling at the western edge of Laurentia. The first cycle represents initial basin development followed by the second cycle, signifying deepening of the basin and marine transgression. The Fairchild group, the oldest and most deformed member of the Wernecke Supergroup is characterized by about 4.6 km of upward grading siltstone to shale with carbonates, representing a low sediment input environment and a shallow basin. The bottom of the Fairchild group is not exposed, but is thought to rest on the crystalline basement. These sediments have since been metamorphosed to slate, phyllite, or fine-grained chloritoid- or garnet-porphyroblastic muscovite-chlorite-quartz schist by the Racklan orogeny at 1.6 Ga, as well as magmatism and hydrothermal activity. The Quartet group records a time of increasing sediment input beginning with shales and coarsening upward to siltstone and carbonates. The Gillespie lake group is characterised by wavy and plane bedding and preserved cross laminations, algal mats, stromatolites, pisolites, intraclasts, and mud-cracks, indicating a shallow water depositional environment.

== Racklan Orogeny ==
The Racklan orogeny occurred at 1.60 Ga, after the complete deposition of the Wernecke supergroup but before the deposition of the Wernecke breccias. The timing of the orogeny is constrained by the emplacement of the Wernecke Breccias, which are not deformed and have been dated to 1.59 Ga. The Racklan Orogeny is characterised by low-grade greenschist metaporhism, foliation, superposed crenulations and kink bands. Two sets of major folds have been identified, with first trending north and verging to the east and the second trending east and verging south With successive compression, folding became overturned followed by crenulation and kink band formation during subsequent deformation. Seismic imagery shows Racklan orogeny to be thin skinned, although a lack of basement exposure means this cannot be confirmed.

== Pinguicla Group ==
Deposition of the Pinguicla group began at 1.38 Ga after a significant period of weathering. Deposition of these sediments indicates a period of rifting and extension in the area, as supported by the incidence of the Hart River volcanic at the same time period. The period of rifting and crustal extension embodied by the Hart River volcanics was followed by basin sedimentation represented by the Pinguicula group. The Pinguicula group is separated from the Wernecke Supergroup by an angular unconformity, representing an erosional stage after the Racklan orogenic event. Three units compose the Pinguicula Group, deep water shales, mid depth carbonates and intertidal carbonates, suggesting an ocean basin environment. Formation of the Pinguicula basin is thought to be related to Laurentia rifting from another unknown continent.

== Hematite Creek Group ==
The Hematite Creek Group was deposited in the middle Proterozoic, 1.0 Ga - 1.1 Ga. This group is delineated from the Pinguicla Group by a 300 million year gap in the sediment record and an unconformity type boundary. The Hematite Creek Group is approximately a kilometer thick and is composed mostly of clastic and carbonate sediments. These sediments were deposited in a shallow ocean environment, as evidenced by preserved stromatolites, mud cracks and interference ripples. Sediment supply for the Hematite Creek basin formation has been tentatively attributed to the Grenville orogeny of approximately the same time period through U-Pb dating of zircon grains.

== Corn Creek Orogeny ==
The second orogenic event in the Wernecke mountain area, the Corn Creek orogeny, occurred during the late Proterozoic, 1.0 Ga, after the deposition of the Hematite Creek group. The Corn Creek orogeny deformed the Pinguicula group and the Hematite Creek group in an east side up compressional episode, resulting in significant uplift, metamorphism, and thrust faults and folds verging south west. The Wernecke supergroup shows basically no deformation attributable to this orogeny and retains the east side down mode of deformation acquired during the Racklan orogen. The sole exception is the reactivation of a normal fault within the Wernecke supergroup. This implies Corn Creek was a thin-skinned style compressional event and deformation involved only the Pinguicula and Hematite Creek groups. The unconformity style boundary seen between Hematite Creek strata and Windermere supergroup allows for measurement of the deformation. While not involved in substantial deformation of the Wernecke sediments, the Corn Creek orogeny may have been involved in the exhumation of the Wernecke Supergroup in some areas.) This theory is sustained by the similar cooling age of the white mica in the Wernecke supergroup and the timing of Corn Creek orogeny, dated using 40Ar–39Ar methods.

== Windermere Supergroup ==
Windermere Supergroup was deposited on an angular uniformity over the Hematite Creek Group. Using isotopic ages of volcanic rocks emplaced before sedimentation began as well as correlations with sediments on other continents, the beginning of the Windermere Supergroup can be dated at 780 Ma. The Windermere sedimentary deposits formed in a rift or passive margin environment. In contrast to the sediments deposited before, the Windermere Supergroup shows glacially deposited sediments as well as clastic-carbonate grand cycles. The Windermere strata have been correlated to outcrops along the entire North American west coast. This supergroup is composed of two main subgroups, the Rapitan Group and an upper package sometimes referred to as the Hay Creek group. The Rapitan Group consists of glacial related sediments where as the Hay Creek Group consists of more typical clastic-carbonate grand cycles.

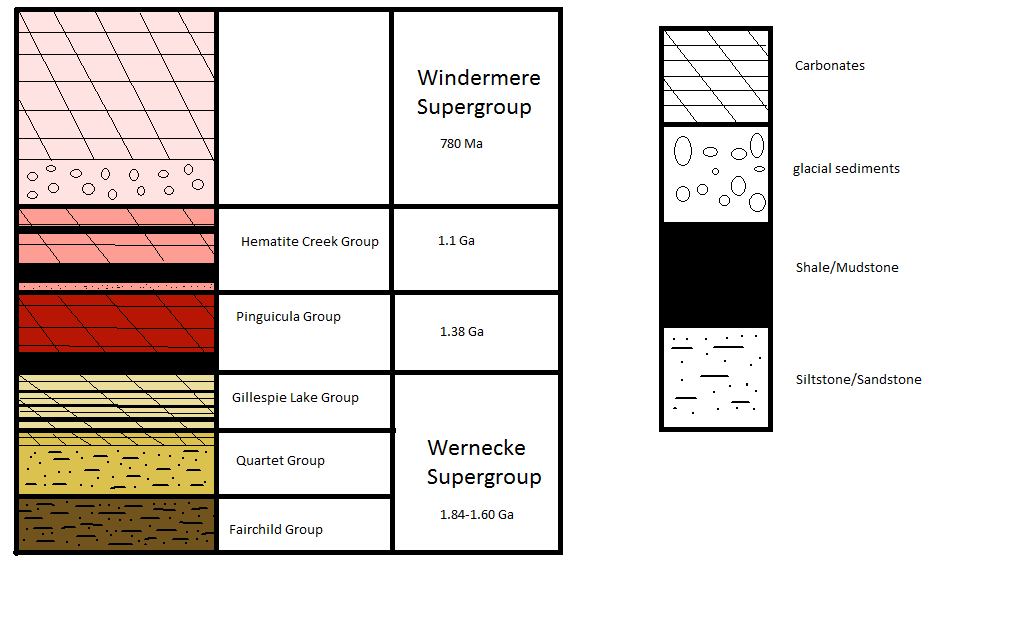

== Laramide Orogeny ==
The Laramide orogeny occurred Late Cretaceous to Tertiary, through the end of the Cretaceous, much later than the Racklan and Corn Creek orogenies. The Laramide orogeny is associated with the accretion of exotic superterranes on the West Coast of North America, as well as the subduction of the Farallon and Kula plates. The effects of the Laramide orogeny are seen throughout North America in mountain belts stretching from Mexico to Alaska. This action resulted in strong metamorphism, plutonism and crustal thickening in the Yukon, including the Wernecke Mountains. Magmatism in the area during the Cretaceous resulted from easterly-directed subduction of the Farallon plates. This instigated felsic to intermediate arc-trench related magmatic activity spanning the Yukon Territory from 99 to 89 Ma. In central Yukon, these rocks were deformed in a northerly-directed, fold-and-thrust belt in the Jurassic to Cretaceous possibly due to more accretion on the West coasts. This deformation resulted in the development of three major faults in the area, the Dawson, Tombstone and Robert Service faults. The gold bearing Tombstone Plutonic suite of intrusions were emplaced into these rocks at 92 Mas.

== Mineralization ==
The Wernecke Mountains are home to many rich mineral deposits, including the largest gold deposit in the Yukon, the Eagle Gold deposit. This deposit is found is the Tombstone Plutonic Suite, a series of gold bearing intrusions stretching across Alaska and the Yukon known as the Tombstone Gold Belt. These deposits are characterized by sheeted mineralized veins within granitoid intrusions and fault-veins, breccias and replacement style mineralization in the country rocks. The Eagle Gold deposit in particular is a hydrothermal vein hosted gold deposit. The gold bearing veins cut through felsic intrusions and country rock, dipping south and striking NE.

== See also ==
- List of fossiliferous stratigraphic units in Yukon

== Sources ==
1. Cook, Frederick A (1988). "Middle Proterozoic compressional orogen in northwestern Canada". Journal of Geophysical Research. 93 (B8): 8985–9005. Bibcode:1988JGR....93.8985C. doi:10.1029/JB093iB08p08985.
2. Delaney, G D (1981). "The Mid-Proterozoic Wernecke Supergroup, Wernecke Mountains, Yukon Territory". In Campbell, F H A (ed.). Proterozoic basins of Canada. Symposium held in Halifax, May 1980 (PDF). Vol. Paper 81–10. Geological Survey of Canada. pp. 1–23. "In 1970 the Geological Survey of Canada published the results of a symposium on "Basins and Geosynclines of the Canadian Shield" (GSC Paper 70-40). The studies on which this symposium was based were largely of a reconnaissance nature but provided the foundation upon which Precambrian geologists have been able to establish local, regional, and continental frameworks"
3. Eisbacher, G H (1985). "Late Proterozoic rifting, glacial sedimentation, and sedimentary cycles in the light of windermere deposition, western Canada". Palaeogeography, Palaeoclimatology, Palaeoecology. 51 (1–4): 231–254. Bibcode:1985PPP....51..231E. doi:10.1016/0031-0182(85)90087-2.
4. Various Contributors to the Paleobiology Database. "Fossilworks: Gateway to the Paleobiology Database". Archived from the original on 2022-03-25.
5. Gaffin, Jane (2007). Livingston Wernecke: an Idol in Yukon Mining Annals and the House of the Guggenheims (PDF). Archived (PDF) from the original on 2 May 2016.
6. Laughton, John R; Thorkelson, Derek J; Brideau, Marc-André; Hunt, Julie A; Marshall, Daniel D (2005). "Early Proterozoic orogeny and exhumation of Wernecke Supergroup revealed by vent facies of Wernecke Breccia, Yukon, Canada". Canadian Journal of Earth Sciences. 42 (6): 1033–1044. Bibcode:2005CaJES..42.1033L. doi:10.1139/e04-085.
7. Narbonne, Guy M; Aitken, James D (1995). "Neoproterozoic of the Mackenzie Mountains, northwestern Canada". Precambrian Research. 73 (1–4): 101–121. Bibcode:1995PreR...73..101N. doi:10.1016/0301-9268(94)00073-Z.
8. Norris, Donald Kring (1997). "The geology, mineral and hydrocarbon potential of northern Yukon Territory and northwestern District of Mackenzie". Geological Survey of Canada. Bulletin (Geological Survey of Canada). 422. Ottawa. ISBN 978-0660160702.
9. Ross, G M (1991). "Tectonic setting of the Windermere Supergroup revisited". Geology. 19 (11): 1125–1198. Bibcode:1991Geo....19.1125R. doi:10.1130/0091-7613(1991)019<1125:tsotws>2.3.co;2.
10. Stephens, Julian R; Mair, John L; Oliver, Nicholas H S; Hart, Craig J R; Baker, Timothy (2004). "Structural and mechanical controls on intrusion-related deposits of the Tombstone Gold Belt, Yukon, Canada, with comparisons to other vein-hosted ore-deposit types". Journal of Structural Geology. 26 (6–7): 1025–1041. Bibcode:2004JSG....26.1025S. doi:10.1016/j.jsg.2003.11.008.
11. Thorkelson, Derek J; Abbott, J Grant; Mortensen, James K; Creaser, Robert A; Villeneuve, Michael E; McNicoll, Vicki J; Layer, Paul W (2005). "Early and Middle Proterozoic evolution of Yukon, Canada". Canadian Journal of Earth Sciences. 42 (6): 1045–1071. Bibcode:2005CaJES..42.1045T. doi:10.1139/E04-075. S2CID 67006327.
12. Thorkelson, Derek J (2000). "Geology and mineral occurrences of the Slats Creek, Fairchild Lake and "Dolores Creek" areas, Wernecke Mountains (106D/16, 106C/13, 106C/14), Yukon Territory" (PDF). Exploration and Geological Services Division, Yukon, Indian and Northern Affairs Canada. Bulletin (Geological Survey of Canada). 10: 73. Archived (PDF) from the original on 15 April 2010.
13. Villeneuve, Michael E; Thériault, R J; Ross, G M (1991). "U–Pb ages and Sm–Nd signature of two subsurface granites from the Fort Simpson magnetic high, northwest Canada". Canadian Journal of Earth Sciences. 28 (7): 1003–1008. Bibcode:1991CaJES..28.1003V. doi:10.1139/e91-091.
