= Eoporpita =

Eoporpita Temporal range: late Ediacaran ~555 Ma
- Fossil of Eoporpita

Scientific classification
- Kingdom: Animalia
- Phylum: Cnidaria
- Class: Hydrozoa
- Order: Anthoathecata
- Family: Porpitidae (?)
- Genus: †Eoporpita; Wade, 1972
- Species: †E. medusa

Binomial name
- †Eoporpita medusa Wade, 1972

Disk-shaped Ediacaran fossil

Eoporpita is a disc or ellipse-shaped Ediacaran fossil with unsure taxonomy/classification. It is known from its type species, Eoporpita medusa, the only species within the genus Eoporpita.

== Classification debate/interpretations ==
There are a few different interpretations of Eoporpita's taxonomy. The taxobox to the right describes Eoporpita as Mary Wade first did in 1972 as a Hydrozoa member and within the phylum Cnidaria. However, more recently, Eoporpita has been reinterpreted as either a benthic organism like a xenophyophore or the internal contents of Aspidella, together forming a holdfast for a frond-like organism. More research on Eoporpita is needed.

== Morphology ==
General morphology:

Eoporpita is circular with radial symmetry. Its surface is smooth with some radial striae and a raised central dome. Annular shaped chambers surround the central dome, similar in look to ring-shaped ripples in a water body. Its average radius is from 2 to over 8 cm.

Wade interpretation:

Eoporpita's aboral surface is the side with its central dome. Two series of club-shaped 'tentacles' emanate from the central dome. The outer series of 'tentacles,' interpreted as dactylozooids, are all about the same length. On the other hand, the inner series of 'tentacles,' interpreted as gonozooids, are shorter but of varying lengths. These zooids' presence suggests that Eoporpita was a colonial organism. The 'tentacles' appear massed and stacked, with the fossil being tallest at the central dome and thinning out closer to its edges.

Holdfast interpretation:

There are two series of club-shaped 'lobes' radiating from the central dome of Eoporpita. The outer series of 'lobes' are all of relatively the same length, while the inner 'lobes' are shorter but of varying lengths. These lobes are most likely hollow and separated as opposed to massed together. The 'lobes' appear to form tiers.

== Etymology ==
Eoporpita's namesake is Porpita, a genus of hydrozoans in the family Porpitidae. When describing Eoporpita in 1972, Mary Wade noticed slight similarities in their affinities. However, Wade ultimately decided that Eoporpita's 'tentacles,' which she interpreted as dactylozooids and gonozooids, differentiated the two enough.

== Occurrence ==
Specimens of Eoporpita have been found in:

- Flinders Ranges, Australia
- Mackenzie Mountains, Northwest Territories, Canada
- White Sea, Russia

== See also ==
- List of Ediacaran genera
- Aspidella
