= Fracking in Canada =

Induced hydraulic fracturing
- Schematic depiction of hydraulic fracturing for shale gas.
- Process type: Mechanical
- Industrial sector(s): Mining
- Main technologies or sub-processes: Fluid pressure
- Product(s): Natural gas, petroleum
- Inventor: Floyd Farris; J.B. Clark (Stanolind Oil and Gas Corporation)
- Year of invention: 1947

Fracking in Canada was first used in Alberta in 1953 to extract hydrocarbons from the giant Pembina oil field, the biggest conventional oil field in Alberta, which would have produced very little oil without fracturing. Since then, over 170,000 oil and gas wells have been fractured in Western Canada. Fracking is a process that stimulates natural gas or oil in wellbores to flow more easily by subjecting hydrocarbon reservoirs to pressure through the injection of fluids or gas at depth causing the rock to fracture or to widen existing cracks.

New hydrocarbon production areas have been opened as fracking stimulating techniques are coupled with more recent advances in horizontal drilling. Complex wells that are many hundreds or thousands of metres below ground are extended even further through drilling of horizontal or directional sections. Massive fracturing has been widely used in Alberta since the late 1970s to recover gas from low-permeability sandstones such as the Spirit River Formation. The productivity of wells in the Cardium, Duvernay, and Viking formations in Alberta, Bakken formation in Saskatchewan, Montney and Horn River formations in British Columbia would not be possible without fracking technology. Fracking has revitalized legacy oilfields. "Hydraulic fracturing of horizontal wells in unconventional shale, silt and tight sand reservoirs unlocks gas, oil and liquids production that until recently was not considered possible." Conventional oil production in Canada was on a decrease since about 2004 but this changed with the increased production from these formations using fracking. Fracking is one of the primary technologies employed to extract shale gas or tight gas from unconventional reservoirs.

In 2012 Canada averaged 356 active drilling rigs, coming in second to the United States with 1,919 active drilling rigs. The United States represents just below 60 percent of worldwide activity. New Brunswick, Newfoundland, Nova Scotia and Quebec have banned fracking.

== Geological formations ==
The Spirit River, Cardium, Duvernay, Viking, Montney (AB and BC), and Horn River formations are stratigraphical units of the Western Canadian Sedimentary Basin (WCSB) which underlies 1,400,000 square kilometres (540,000 mi^{2}) of Western Canada and which contains one of the world's largest reserves of petroleum and natural gas. The Montney Formation, located in Northeast British Columbia and West-Central Alberta, and the Duvernay Formation located in central Alberta, are currently the most prospective formations in the WCSB for development of unconventional oil and gas reservoirs that require hydraulic fracturing stimulations. The Bakken formation is a rock unit of the Williston Basin that extends into southern Saskatchewan. In the early 2000s significant increase in production the Williston Basin began because of application of horizontal drilling techniques, especially in the Bakken Formation.

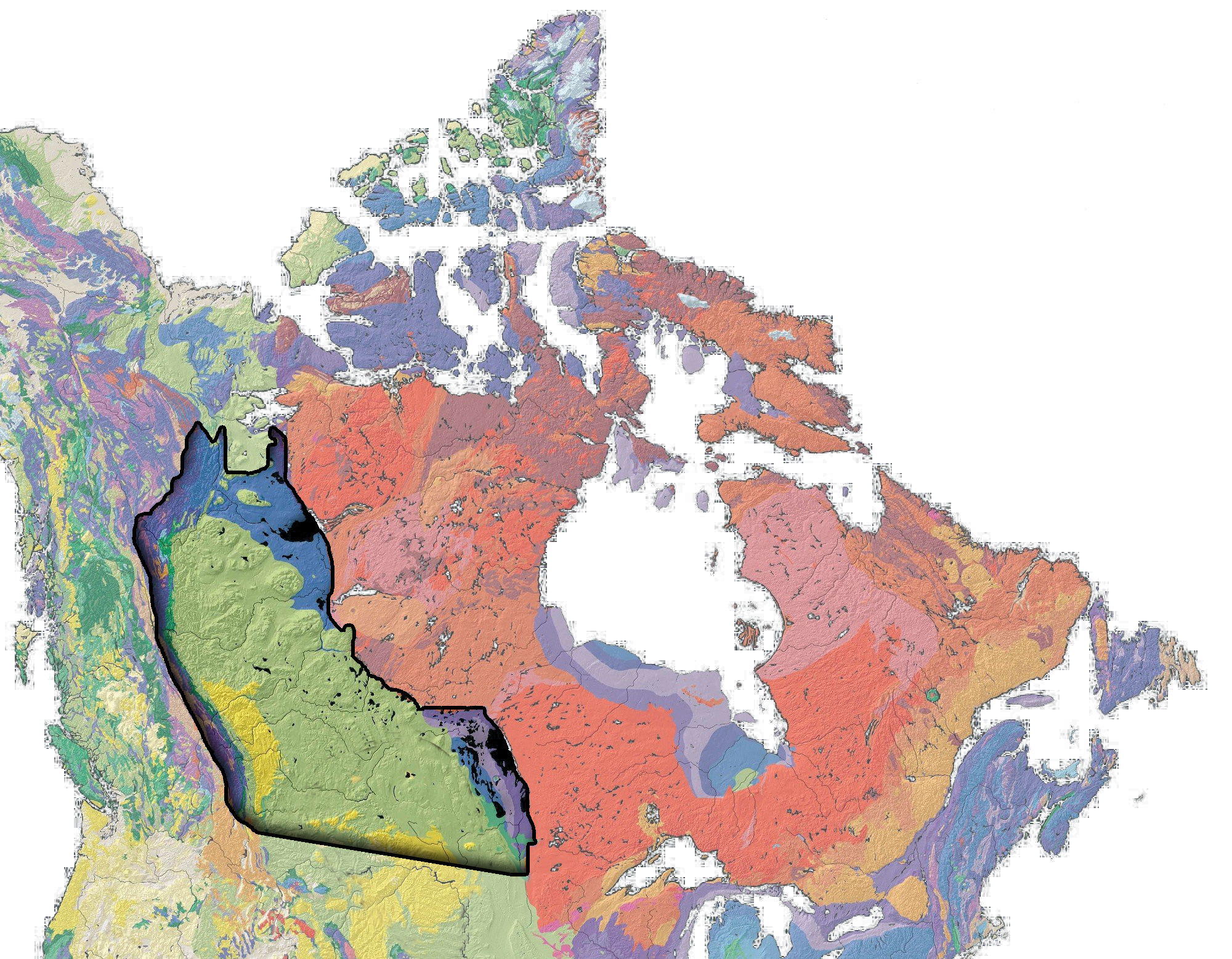
Outline of the Western Canadian Sedimentary Basin

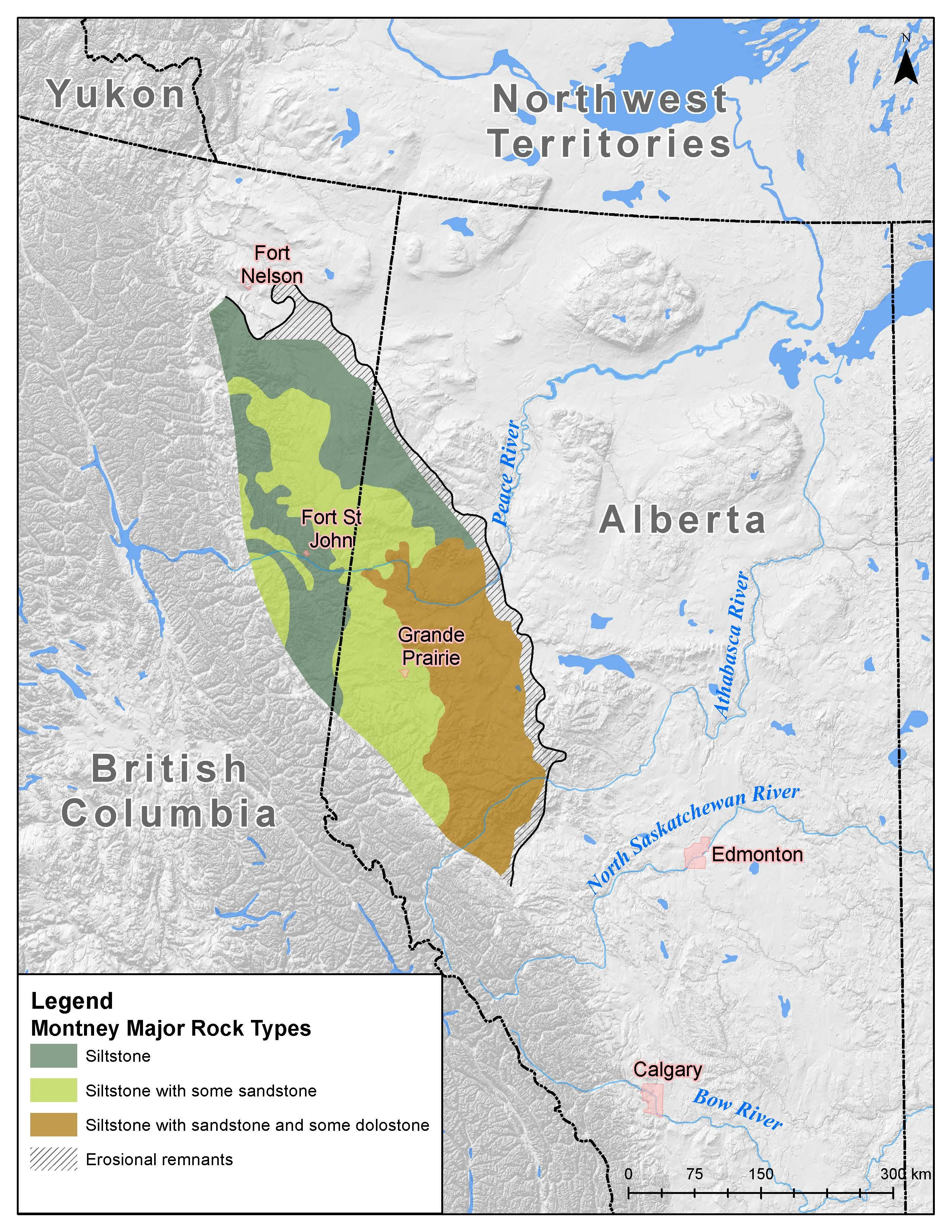
Generalized map showing the location of the Montney Formation.

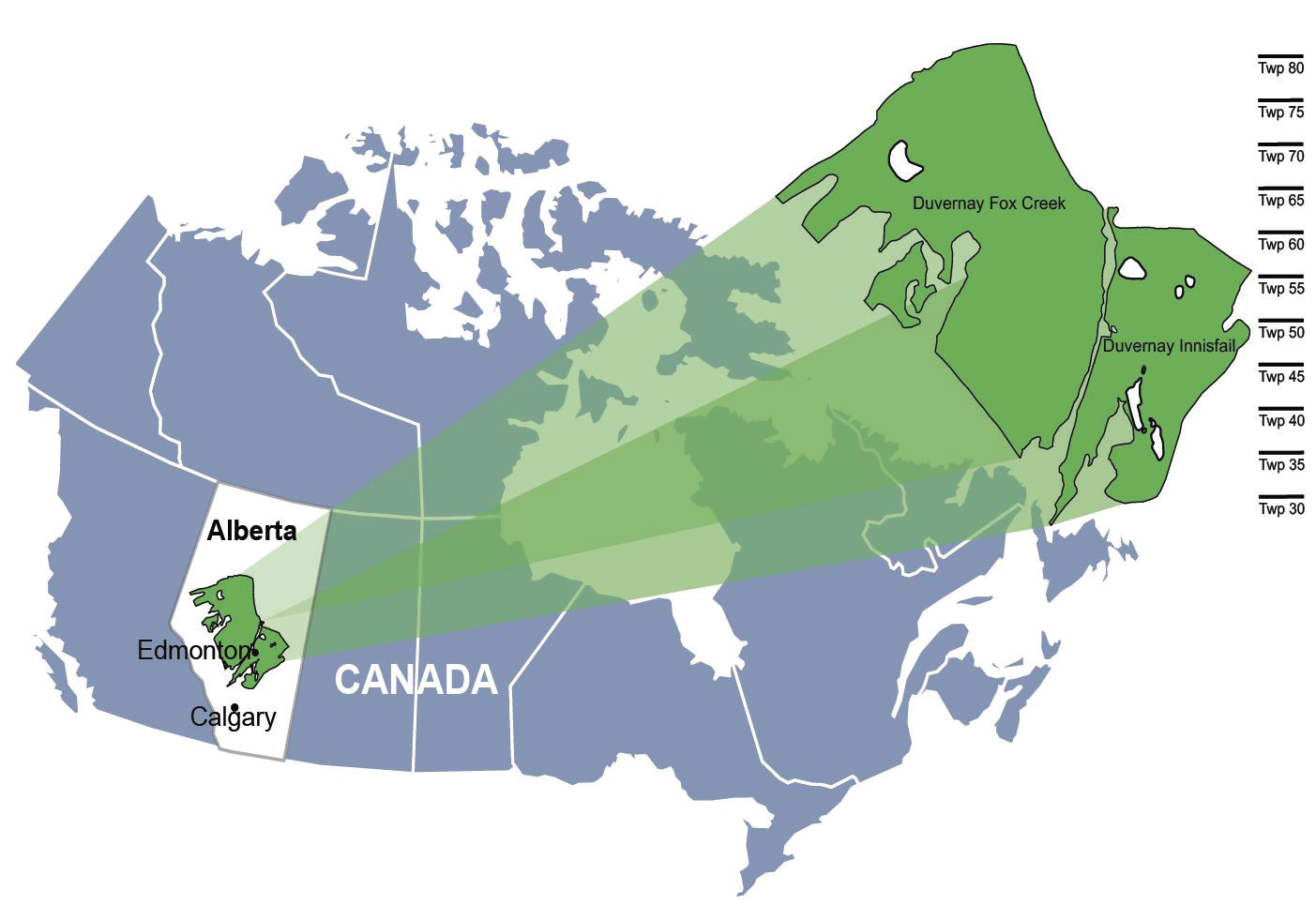
Duvernay depositional extent in central Alberta, Canada.

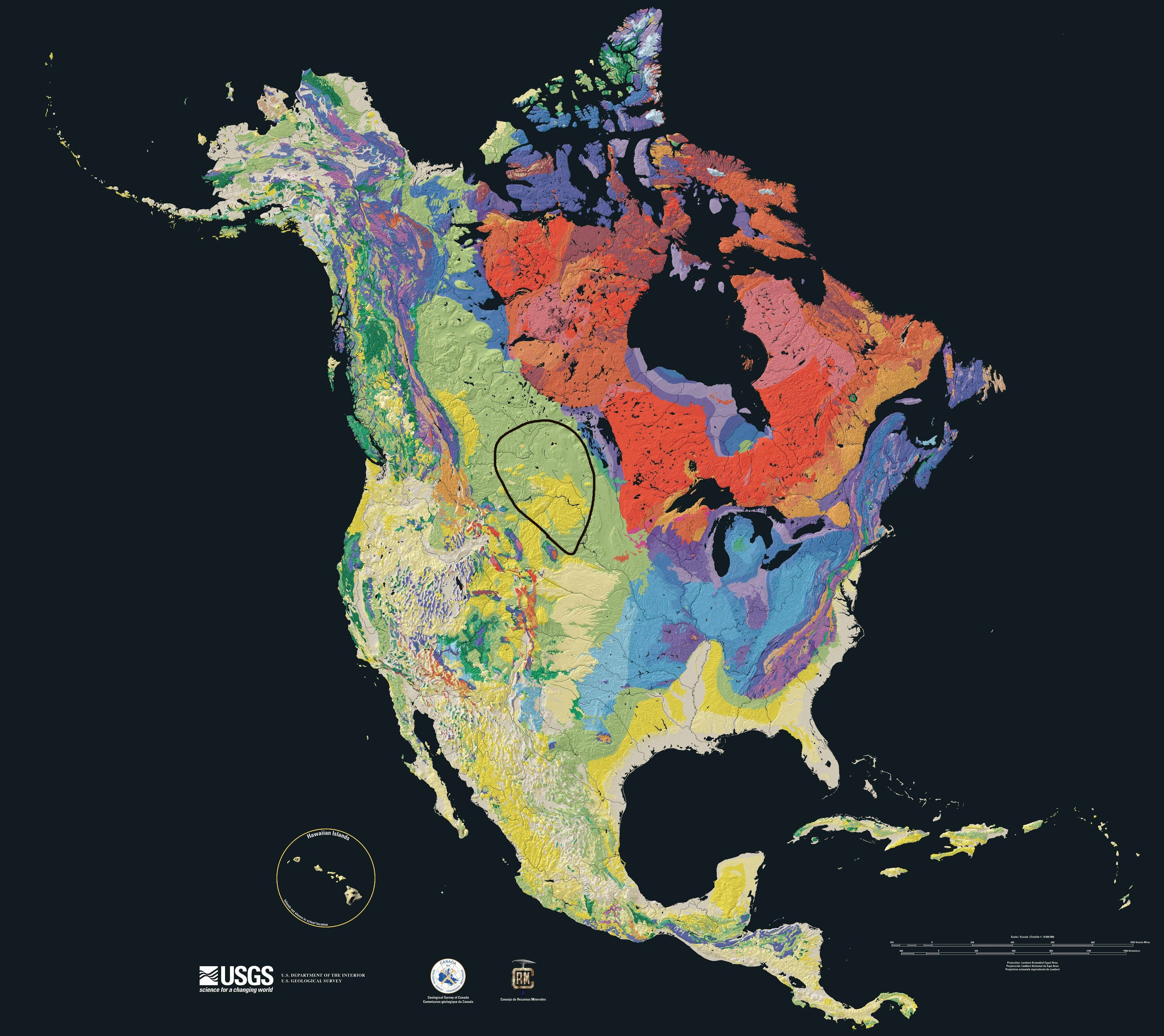
North America showing position of Williston Basin

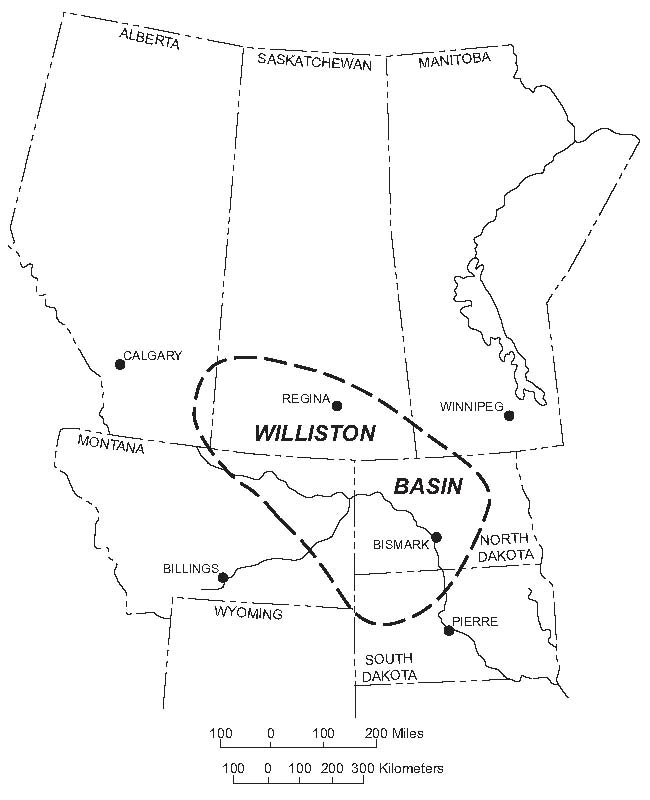
Location of Williston Basin (USGS)

== Technologies ==
The first commercial application of hydraulic fracturing was by Halliburton Oil Well Cementing Company (Howco) in 1949 in Stephens County, Oklahoma and in Archer County, Texas, using a blend of crude oil and a proppant of screened river sand into existing wells with no horizontal drilling. In the 1950s about 750 US gal (2,800 L; 620 imp gal) of fluid and 400 lb (180 kg) were used. By 2010 treatments averaged "approximately 60,000 US gal (230,000 L; 50,000 imp gal) of fluid and 100,000 lb (45,000 kg) of propping agent, with the largest treatments exceeding 1,000,000 US gal (3,800,000 L; 830,000 imp gal) of fluid and 5,000,000 lb (2,300,000 kg) of proppant."

In 2011 the Wall Street Journal summarized the history of hydraulic fracturing,

"Only a decade ago Texas oil engineers hit upon the idea of combining two established technologies to release natural gas trapped in shale formations. Horizontal drilling—in which wells turn sideways after a certain depth—opens up big new production areas. Producers then use a 60-year-old technique called hydraulic fracturing—in which water, sand and chemicals are injected into the well at high pressure—to loosen the shale and release gas (and increasingly, oil)."

— Wall Street Journal 2011

Horizontal oil or gas wells were unusual until the 1980s. Then in the late 1980s, operators along the Texas Gulf Coast began completing thousands of oil wells by drilling horizontally in the Austin Chalk, and giving 'massive' hydraulic fracturing treatments to the wellbores. Horizontal wells proved much more effective than vertical wells in producing oil from the tight chalk. In the late 1990s in Texas, combining horizontal drilling and multi-stage hydraulic fracturing techniques made large-scale commercial shale gas production possible. Since then, shale gas wells have become longer and the number of stages per well has increased. As shale gas companies target deeper, hotter, more unstable reservoirs, drilling technologies have been developed to tackle challenges in various environments.

Drilling Technology	Description	Environment
Underbalanced drilling	Drilling fluid operated at pressure less than pore pressure; Using compressed gas or foam; Speeds up penetration rate, reduces drilling costs and formation damage	Depleted zones, highly fractured and porous formation
Percussion/hammer drilling	Repeated impact to break rock at drill bit; Drill bit contact with formation is 2% of operational time; Less tool wear; Impact and rebound can be self-sufficient and self-sustained	Hard rock formations
Radial drilling	50 to 100 meters long laterals from mother well; Controlled direction; Increase drainage radius and flow profile near wellbores; Rotary, jet-impact, plasma drilling methods	Near cap rock, water table, faults, and depleted zones
Drilling with liner/casing	Installing liner without extracting drilling assembly; Prevents fracturing, closure and collapse of wellbore	Swelling shales, creeping formations, high pressure zones, and depleted zones
Monodiameter drilling liner	Creates continuous diameter of casing using expandable tubular technology; Decreases amount of drilling fluid and cement volumes, casing weight, and cutting disposal	Same environment as conventional telescoping casing installation
Non-invasive drilling fluids	Polymer, water, and oil mixture; Polymer seal pore throats and fractures; Prevents infiltration of fluid into formation	Depleted zones, highly fractures and porous formations
Reversible invert emulsion fluid	Can switch between water-in-oil and oil-in-water emulsion; Water-in-oil fluid prevent fluid loss, washout, and swelling; Oil-in-water offer better cleanup for better cementing	Swelling shales, salt zones, highly fractured and porous formations

In parallel with the advancement in drilling technologies, injection technologies have also seen changes.

Injection Technology	Description	Drawbacks
Gas	Commonly use carbon dioxide and nitrogen; Does not plug pore throats; Carbon dioxide replaces adsorbed natural gas in reservoir; Faster flowback; Avoids use of water; Higher production if using carbon dioxide.	Low proppant carrying capacity; High velocity proppant erodes equipment; Pressurized containers for transport and storage
Liquid carbon dioxide	Liquid at -34.5 °C and 1.4 MPa; High proppant carrying capacity; Turns to gas in reservoir; Replaces adsorbed gas in reservoir; Does not plug pore throats; Fast flowback; Avoids use of water; Higher production.	Transport and storage of low temperature gas; Potential greenhouse effect
Supercritical Carbon dioxide(SC‐CO2)	Usually at depths greater than 1,000 m; Not lower than (L‐CO2) temperatures.; Viscosity of SC‐CO2 is much lower than normal L-CO2.; SC‐CO2 breakdown pressure is lower than L-CO2	Difficult to change to this liquid state; Difficult to get this low temperature; In this case depth and pressure also difficult to achieve
Liquefied petroleum gas (LPG)	No waste production and environment friendly; Almost 100% of propane gas is pumped back; Only 50% of hydraulic frack fluid remains underground	Much more expensive than water; Potential risks to use in field work operation; Transport and storage is a challenge
High energy gas fracturing (HEGF)	To produce multiple radial fractures in formation; Cheap operation; Simple implementation; Little pollution to formation	Not well suited in overcoming certain types of recurring damage mechanisms, such as salt deposition
Foam	Liquid aerated, typically with N_{2}; Has wide range of viscosity based on foam ratio; Less water usage; Reduces swelling but cannot eliminate it; Reduces water-locking	Reduces but cannot eliminate swelling and water-locking issues
Impulse sand fracturing	Effective and environmental friendly; Highly increase well production; Decrease the volume of fracturing proppant; Lower sand plugging risks; High initial fluid rate	Expensive; Prolonged plugging operations

== Cost and lifespan of hydraulic fracturing ==
Oil producers spend US$12 million upfront to drill a well but it is so efficient and produces so well during its short, 18-month lifespan, that oil producers using this technology can still make a profit even with oil at $50 a barrel.

Lifespan of hydraulic fracturing:

The lifecycle of shale gas development can vary from a few years to decades and occurs in six major stages, as described by Natural Resources Canada (NRC), assuming all approvals from the various regulatory authorities have been obtained:

- Stage One: Exploration, which involves applying for the appropriate licenses and permits, leasing the mineral rights, Indigenous consultations, community consultations and geophysical studies, including geological assessments and seismic surveys;
- Stage Two: Site preparation and well construction, which includes exploratory drilling to determine the physical and chemical characteristics of the rock and to assess the quality and quantity of the resource;
- Stage Three: Drilling, which includes horizontal drilling;
- Stage Four: Stimulation, which is the use of hydraulic fracturing to enable the hydrocarbons to flow to the wellbore;
- Stage Five: Well operation and production, which can operate for 10 to 30 years; and,
- Stage Six: End of production and reclamation, which requires the company to properly seal the well, clean and inspect the site. Reclamation occurs over several years as the company remediates any contamination, restores soil profiles, replants native vegetation and any other reclamation work required by local regulations.

== Alberta ==
Because of its vast oil and gas resources, Alberta is the busiest province in terms of hydraulic fracturing. The first well to be fractured in Canada was the discovery well of the giant Pembina oil field in 1953 and since then over 170,000 wells have been fractured. The Pembina field is a "sweet spot" in the much larger Cardium Formation, and the formation is still growing in importance as multistage horizontal fracturing is increasingly used.

The Alberta Geological Survey evaluated the potential of new fracturing techniques to produce oil and gas from shale formations in the province, and found at least five prospects which show immediate promise: the Duvernay Formation, the Muskwa Formation, the Montney Formation, the Nordegg Member, and the basal Banff and Exshaw Formations. These formations may contain up to 1.3 quadrillion cubic feet (37,000 km^{3}) of gas-in-place.

Between 2012 and 2015, 243 horizontal multistage fractured wells were drilled in the Duvernay Formation producing 36.9 million barrels (5.87 million cubic metres) of oil equivalent, distributed in 1.6 million bbl (250 thousand m^{3}) of oil, 11.7 million bbl (1.86 million m^{3}) of natural-gas condensate, and 23.6 million bbl (3.75 million m^{3}) of natural gas. 201 of these wells were drilled in the Kaybob assessment area, whereas 36 wells, were drilled in the Edson-Willesden Green area and 6 wells in the Innisfail area, with horizontal lengths between 1000 and 2800 meters and well spacings between 150 and 450 meters. The development of condensate-rich areas in the Duvernay formation remain steady as the natural-gas condensate is a key product to dilute the bitumen produced from the closely located oil sands deposits in Athabasca, Peace River, and Cold Lake, and is traded with the same reference price as WTI oil.

Even as the price of oil declined dramatically in 2014, hydraulic fracturing in so-called "sweet spots" such as the Cardium and Duvernay in Alberta, remained financially viable.

== British Columbia ==
The most shale gas activity in Canada has taken place in the province of British Columbia. In 2015, 80% of the natural gas production in the province was produced from unconventional sources, where the portion of the Montney Formation located in British Columbia (BC) contributed 3.4 billion cubic feet (96 million cubic metres) per day, corresponding to 64.4% of the province's total gas production. This formation contains 56% of the province's recoverable raw gas that corresponds to an estimate of 29.8 trillion cubic feet (840 billion cubic metres), and the remaining recoverable gas is distributed in other unconventional gas plays as the Liard Basin, Horn River Basin, and Cordova Basin, all of them located in the northeast portion of the province.

Talisman Energy, which was acquired by the Spanish company Repsol in 2015, is one operator company that "has extensive operations in the Montney shale gas area." In late July 2011 the Government of British Columbia gave Talisman Energy, whose head office is in Calgary, a twenty-year long-term water licence to draw water from the BC Hydro-owned Williston Lake reservoir.

In 2013, the Fort Nelson First Nation, a remote community in northeastern B.C. with 800 community members, expressed frustration with royalties associated with gas produced through hydraulic fracturing in their territory. Three of British Columbia's four shale-gas reserves – the Horn River, Liard and Cordova Basins are on their lands. "Those basins hold the key to BC's LNG ambitions."

== Saskatchewan ==
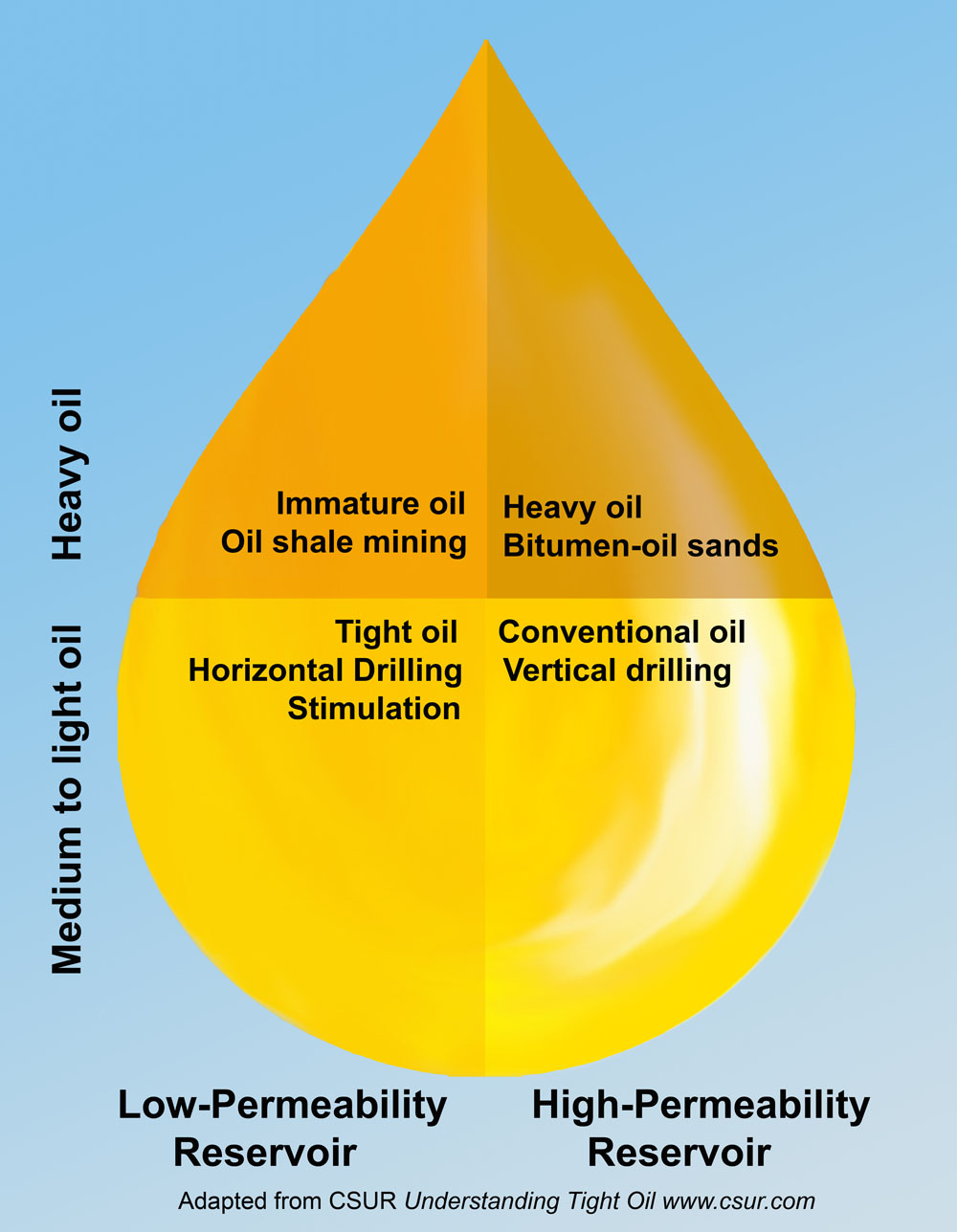
Bakken oil: tight, sweet, low porosity, low permeability (difficult to extract); Adapted from CSUR "Understanding Tight Oil"

The Bakken shale oil and gas boom underway since 2009, driven by hydraulic fracturing technologies, has contributed to record growth, high employment rates and increase in population, in the province of Saskatchewan. Hydraulic fracturing has benefited small towns like Kindersley which saw its population increase to over 5,000 with the boom. Kindersley sells its treated municipal wastewater to oilfield service companies to use in hydraulic fracturing. As the price of oil dropped dramatically in late 2014 partially in response to the shale oil boom, towns like Kindersley became vulnerable.

== Quebec ==
The Utica Shale, a stratigraphical unit of Middle Ordovician age underlies much of the northeastern United States and in the subsurface in the provinces of Quebec and Ontario.

Drilling and producing from the Utica Shale began in 2006 in Quebec, focusing on an area south of the St. Lawrence River between Montreal and Quebec City. Interest has grown in the region since Denver-based Forest Oil Corp. announced a significant discovery there after testing two vertical wells. Forest Oil said its Quebec assets has similar rock properties to the Barnett shale in Texas.

Forest Oil, which has several junior partners in the region, has drilled both vertical and horizontal wells. Calgary-based Talisman Energy has drilled five vertical Utica wells, and began drilling two horizontal Utica wells in late 2009 with its partner Questerre Energy, which holds under lease more than 1 million gross acres of land in the region. Other companies in the play are Quebec-based Gastem and Calgary-based Canbriam Energy.

The Utica Shale in Quebec potentially holds 4 trillion cubic feet (110 km^{3}) at production rates of 1 million cubic feet (28,000 m^{3}) per day. From 2006 through 2009 24 wells, both vertical and horizontal, were drilled to test the Utica. Positive gas flow test results were reported, although none of the wells were producing at the end of 2009. Gastem, one of the Utica shale producers, took its Utica Shale expertise to drill across the border in New York state.

In June 2011, the Quebec firm Pétrolia claimed to have discovered about 30 billion barrels (4.8 km^{3}) of oil on Anticosti Island, which is the first time that significant reserves were found in the province.

Debates on the merits of hydraulic fracturing have been on-going in Quebec since at least 2008. In 2012 the Parti Québécois government imposed a five-year moratorium on hydraulic fracturing in the region between Montreal and Quebec City, called the St. Lawrence Lowlands, with a population of about 2 million people.

In February 2014, prior to announcing her provincial election campaign, former Premier of Quebec and former leader of the Parti Québécois (PQ), Pauline Marois, announced that the provincial government would help finance two exploratory shale gas operations as a prelude to hydraulic fracturing on the island, with the province pledging $115-million to finance drilling for two separate joint ventures in exchange for rights to 50% of the licences and 60% of any commercial profit. It was the first oil and gas deal of any size for the province. With the change in government that occurred in April 2014, the Liberals of Philippe Couillard could change that decision.

Petrolia Inc., Corridor Resources and Maurel & Prom formed one joint-venture, while Junex Inc. was still seeking a private partner.

In November 2014 a report published by Quebec's advisory office of environmental hearings, the Bureau d’audiences publiques sur l’environnement (BAPE), found "shale gas development in the Montreal-to-Quebec City region wouldn’t be worthwhile." BAPE warned of a "magnitude of potential impacts associated with shale gas industry in an area as populous and sensitive as the St. Lawrence Lowlands." The Quebec Oil and Gas Association challenged the accuracy of BAPE's report. On 16 December 2014 Quebec's Premier Philippe Couillard responded to the BAPE report stating there will be no hydraulic fracturing due to a lack of economic or financial interest and a lack of social acceptability.

== New Brunswick ==
New Brunswick's increased use of natural gas was facilitated by a single event: the arrival of natural gas from Nova Scotia's Sable Offshore Energy Project via the Maritimes and Northeast Pipeline (MNP) in January 2000.

Exploration and Production

The following timeline illustrates the development of New Brunswick's natural gas production industry, post-1999.

2003: Natural gas is discovered and begins at McCully. Producing reservoir is Hiram Brook formation sandstone.

2007: A 45-kilometre pipeline is constructed to connect the McCully gas field with the Maritimes and Northeast mainline and a gas processing plant is constructed in McCully area.

2007: Two natural gas gathering pipelines are constructed (450 metres and 2,000 metres in length) to tie in two existing well pads (F-28 and L-38) to the existing gathering system.

2007: Expansion of the McCully natural gas production including the construction of six new well pads and gathering pipelines.

2008: Further expansion of the McCully natural gas system including construction of a 3.4 kilometre pipeline to tie in well pad I-39.

2009: First hydraulic fracturing of a horizontally drilled well in New Brunswick in the McCully area.

2009: Start of exploratory drilling and hydraulic fracturing in the Elgin area, south of Petitcodiac.

2009–2010: The first shale-targeted wells are drilled in New Brunswick – four wells in the Elgin area, south of Petitcodiac. None are producing.

2014: The last hydraulic fracturing carried out in New Brunswick to date. Corridor Resources conducted hydraulic fracturing using liquid propane at five wells in the McCully and Elgin areas.

== Hydraulic fracturing fluid ==
Under the Canada Oil and Gas Operations Act, the National Energy Board (NEB) requests operators to submit the composition of the hydraulic fracturing fluids used in their operation that will be published online for public disclosure on the FracFocus.ca website.

Most of hydraulic fracturing operations in Canada are done using water. Canada is also one of the most successful countries in the world to use carbon dioxide as fracturing fluid, with 1,200 successful operations by the end of 1990 Liquefied petroleum gas is also used as a fracturing fluid in provinces where usage of water is prohibited such as New Brunswick.

== Possible related earthquakes ==
The sharp seismicity increase observed in recent years in the Western Canada Sedimentary Basin is inferred to be triggered by hydraulic fracturing operations. Most of the seismic events reported in this period are closely located to hydraulic fracturing wells completed in western Alberta and northeast British Columbia. In response to this increased seismicity, in 2015 the Alberta Energy Regulator released the Subsurface Order No. 2 that requires mandatory implementation of a Traffic-Light Protocol (TLP) based on the local magnitude (M_{L}) of seismic events detected during the monitored operations. According to this TLP, the hydraulic fracturing operations can continue as planned when the M_{L}of the detected seismic events are below 2.0 (green light), must be modified and reported to the regulator when a seismic event of M_{L} between 2.0 and 4.0 is detected (amber light), and must be immediately ceased when a seismic event of M_{L} > 4.0 is detected within 5 km of a hydraulic fracturing well (red light). The BC Oil and Gas Commission implemented a similar TLP where the seismicity and surface ground motions must be adequately monitored during hydraulic fracturing operations, and must be suspended if a M_{L} > 4 is detected within 3 km from the well. M_{L} > 4 has been chosen as a red-light threshold by both jurisdictions in western Canada (Alberta and British Columbia) as a seismic event with magnitude below 4 corresponds to a minor earthquake that may be lightly felt, but with no expected property damage. The following table lists some amber or red-light TLP seismic events reported in the Horn River Basin in northeast BC, and in Fox Creek, Alberta. The increased seismic activity in these two areas have been closely attributed to hydraulic fracturing operations.

Time (local)	M	Epicenter	Comments	Coordinates	Notes
4 October 2014 10:17:24	4.3	139 km (86 mi) S of Fort Nelson, BC	Lightly felt in Fort Nelson and Fort St. John, BC. No reports of damage.	57°33′36″N 122°56′24″W	
14 January 2015 09:06:25	3.8	38 km (24 mi) west of Fox Creek, AB	No damage reported	54°21′00″N 117°22′48″W	
22 January 2015 23:49:18	4.4	36 km (22 mi) west of Fox Creek, AB	Lightly felt in Fox Creek	54°28′12″N 117°15′36″W	
13 June 2015 17:57:55	4.6	36 km (22 mi) east of Fox Creek, AB	Felt lightly in Drayton Valley, Edmonton and Edson	54°06′07″N 116°57′00″W	
17 August 2015 13:15:00	4.6	114 km (71 mi) WNW of Fort St. John, BC	Lightly felt in Charlie Lake, BC. No reports of damage.	57°00′00″N 122°07′48″W	
12 January 2016 12:27:21	4.4	25 km (16 mi) north of Fox Creek, AB	Felt as far south as St. Albert, just northwest of Edmonton.	54°28′12″N 117°15′36″W	

== Provincial regulations associated with hydraulic fracturing ==
In Canada, hydraulic fracturing operations are governed by a number of provincial acts, regulations, guidelines, and directives. In this section, existing regulatory instruments are listed by province. Note: lists of provincial governing regulations are not exhaustive and new directives are drafted and implemented by the provincial government as necessary.

British Columbia
Acts	Note
Oil and Gas Activities Act	
Petroleum and Natural Gas Act	
Environmental Management Act	
Water Sustainability Act	
Regulations	Note
Drilling and Production Regulation	
Environmental Protection and Management Regulation	
Consultation and Notification Regulation	
Oil and Gas Activities Act General Regulation	
Guidelines	Note
Flaring and Venting Reduction Guideline	
British Columbia Oil and Gas Commission (BCOGC) Directives	Note
Directive 2010-07: Reporting of Water Production and Flow Back Fluids	

Alberta
Acts	Note
Oil and Gas Conservation Act	
Responsible Energy Development Act	
Environmental Protection and Enhancement Act	
Water Act	
Regulations	Note
Oil and Gas Conservation Regulations	
Responsible Energy Development Act General Regulation	
Environmental Assessment Regulation	
Release Reporting Regulation	
Alberta Energy Regulator (AER) Directives	Note
Directive 008: Casing Cement Depth	
Directive 009: Casing Cementing Minimum Requirements	
Directive 010: Minimum Casing Design Requirements	
Directive 047: Waste Reporting Requirements for Oilfield Waste Management Facilities	
Directive 050: Drilling Waste Management	
Directive 051: Injection and Disposal Wells - Well Classifications, Completions, Logging, and Testing Requirements	
Directive 055: Storage Requirements for the Upstream Petroleum Industry	
Directive 058: Oilfield Waste Management Requirements for the Upstream Petroleum Industry	
Directive 059: Well Drilling and Completions Data Filing Requirements	
Directive 060: Upstream Petroleum Industry Flaring, Incinerating, and Venting	
Directive 070: Emergency Preparedness and Response Requirements for the Petroleum Industry	
Directive 080: Well Logging	
Directive 083: Hydraulic Fracturing - Subsurface Integrity	

Saskatchewan
Acts	Note
The Oil and Gas Conservation Act	
The Water Security Agency Act	
Regulations	Note
The Oil and Gas Conservation Regulation	
The Oil Shale Regulations, 1964	
Guidelines	Note
Guideline PNG026: Gas Migration	
Saskatchewan Hydraulic Fracturing Fluids and Propping Agents Containment and Disposal Guideline	
Saskatchewan Ministry of the Economy (ECON) Directives	Note
Directive PNG005: Casing and Cementing Requirements	
Directive PNG006: Horizontal Oil Well Requirements	
Directive PNG015: Well Abandonment Requirements	
Directive S-10: Saskatchewan Upstream Petroleum Industry Associated Gas Conservation	
Directive S-20: Saskatchewan Upstream Flaring and Incineration Requirements	

Manitoba
Acts	Note
The Oil and Gas Act	
The Water Rights Act	
The Water Protection Act	
The Groundwater and Water Well Act	
Regulations	Note
Drilling and Production Regulation	

Ontario
Acts	Note
Oil, Gas and Salt Resources Act	
Environmental Protection Act	
Ontario Water Resources Act	
Regulations	Note
Regulation 245/97: Exploration, Drilling and Production	
Regulation 387/04: Water Taking and Transfer	
Oil, Gas and Salt Resources of Ontario Provincial Operating Standards	

Quebec
Acts	Note
Petroleum Resources Act	
Mining Act	
Environmental Quality Act	
Regulations	Note
Regulation respecting petroleum, natural gas and underground reservoirs	
Regulation respecting the application of the Environmental Quality Act	
Water Withdrawal and Protection Regulation	

New Brunswick
Acts	Note
Oil and Natural Gas Act	
Underground Storage Act	
Bituminous Shale Act	
Clean Environment Act	
Clean Water Act	
Clean Air Act	
Regulations	Note
Air Quality Regulation	
Environmental Impact Assessment Regulation	
License to Search, Development Permit and Lease Regulation	
Responsible Environmental Management of Oil and Natural Gas Activities in New Brunswick - Rules for Industry	

Nova Scotia
Acts	Note
Petroleum Resources Act	
Underground Hydrocarbons Storage Act	
Regulations	Note
Petroleum Resources Regulations	
Onshore Petroleum Drilling Regulations	
Onshore Petroleum Geophysical Exploration Regulations	
Offshore Petroleum Drilling and Production Regulations	

Prince Edward Island
Acts	Note
Oil and Natural Gas Act	
Environmental Protection Act	
Regulations	Note
Air Quality Regulations	
Watercourse and Wetland Protection Regulations	
Oil and Gas Conservation Regulations	
Permit, Lease and Survey System Regulations	

Newfoundland and Labrador
Acts	Note
Petroleum and Natural Gas Act	
Environmental Protection Act	
Water Resources Act	
Newfoundland and Labrador Atlantic Accord Implementation Newfoundland and Labrador Act	

Yukon
Acts	Note
Oil and Gas Act	
Environment Act	
Waters Act	
Regulations	Note
Oil and Gas Drilling and Production Regulation	

Northwest Territories
Acts	Note
Mackenzie Valley Resource Management Act (MVRMA)	
Northwest Territories Waters Act	
Environmental Protection Act	
Regulations	Note
Northwest Territories Waters Regulations	
Spill Contingency Planning and Reporting Regulations	

== See also ==
- Shale gas by country
- List of countries by recoverable shale gas
- Directional drilling
- Environmental impact of hydraulic fracturing
- Environmental impact of petroleum
- Environmental impact of the oil shale industry
- ExxonMobil Electrofrac
- Fractured Land, a documentary films about hydraulic fracturing in First Nations in Canada
