= Grosmont Formation =

Geologic formation in Canada

- Stratigraphic range: Frasnian
- Type: Geological formation
- Unit of: Woodbend Group
- Sub-units: Hondo Member
- Underlies: Nisku Formation, McMurray Formation
- Overlies: Ireton Formation, Duvernay Formation
- Thickness: up to 230 metres (750 ft)

Lithology
- Primary: Limestone, dolomite
- Other: siltstone, shale

Location
- Coordinates: 58°22′N 114°55′W
- Region: WCSB
- Country: Canada
- Extent: 100,000 square kilometres (38,610 mi^{2})

Type section
- Named for: Grosmont, Alberta
- Named by: H.R. Belyea, 1952

The Grosmont Formation is a stratigraphic unit of Frasnian age in the Western Canadian Sedimentary Basin.

It takes the name from the hamlet of Grosmont, Alberta, and was first described in well Imperial Grosmont No. 1, in 13-17-67-23W4M, central Alberta by H.R. Belyea in 1952.

== Lithology ==
The Formation is composed of limestone and dolomite with minor argillaceous dolomite, siltstone and shale. Anhydrite and anhydritic dolomite occur in the upper part (Hondo Member) in the west and south. Porous and fractured dolomite is predominant in the eastern extent of the Formation.

=== Hydrocarbon production ===
Bitumen is present from the Grosmont Formation in north-eastern Alberta. The Energy Resources Conservation Board of Alberta estimates 406 billion barrels bitumen in place. While most reserves can not be extracted economically with current technology, several production pilots target the Grosmont Formation.

The first attempts to produce oil from the Grosmont dates back to the 1970s, when the Alberta Oil Sands Technology and Research Authority and industry partners Union Oil Canada and Chevron Resources Canada conducted an unsuccessful production pilot. Companies currently involved in Grosmont exploration include Shell Canada, Laricina Energy, Athabasca Oil Corporation, OSUM Oilsands Corp, Husky Energy and Sunshine Oilsands.

== Distribution ==
The Grosmont Formation occurs mostly in the sub-surface in central and northern Alberta. It was observed in outcrop along the Peace River at Vermilion Chutes at 58°22′N 114°55′W

To the east and north, the Grosmont Formation disappears along the pre-Cretaceous erosional edge. Where present, the Grosmont formation is 100 metres (330 ft) to 230 metres (750 ft) thick.

== Relationship to other units ==
The Grosmont Formation is conformably overlain by the Nisku Formation of the Winterburn Group or by a thin part of the Ireton Formation (to which it is equivalent in the south). It conformably overlays the Ireton Formation or Duvernay Formation. At the subcrop edge at its northeastern limit it is unconformably overlain by the McMurray Formation of the Mannville Group.

The lower Grosmont is equivalent to the Mikkwa Formation in northern Alberta. The entire Grosmont is equivalent to the lower Twin Falls Formation (Alexandra Member) and part of the Hay River Formation in the Northwest Territories.

The Grosmont Formation is part of the Woodbend Group.

=== Subdivisions ===
The Hondo Member is an anhydritic sub-division present in the western and southern extents of the Grosmont Formation.
