= Woodbend Group =

Geologic formation in Canada

- Stratigraphic range: Frasnian
- Type: Geological group
- Sub-units: Cooking Lake Formation; Duvernay Formation; Leduc Formation; Ireton Formation
- Underlies: Winterburn Group
- Overlies: Beaverhill Lake Group
- Thickness: up to 700 metres (2,300 ft)

Lithology
- Primary: Limestone, dolomite
- Other: Shale

Location
- Coordinates: 53.34507°N 113.6949°W
- Region: Alberta, British Columbia, Manitoba, Northwest Territories, Saskatchewan, Yukon
- Country: Canada

Type section
- Named by: Imperial Oil
- Year defined: 1950

The Woodbend Group is a stratigraphic unit of Frasnian age in the Western Canadian Sedimentary Basin.

It was first described in the British American Pyrcz No. 1 well by Imperial Oil geological staff in 1950.

== Lithology ==
The formation is composed of crystalline and dolomitized limestone (Cooking Lake Formation) in off-reef areas, bituminous shale and argillaceous limestone, detrital limestone (reef fallout), stromatoporoid calcarenite (Duvernay Formation), gray shale, argillaceous limestone, argillaceous dolomite, and crystalline dolomite (Ireton Formation). In reef build-ups, it consists of massive limestone and dolomite with porosity (Leduc Formation).

=== Hydrocarbon production ===
Oil is produced from the Leduc Formation in central Alberta since the early 1950s. Shale gas and liquids are extracted from the Duvernay Formation using horizontal drilling and multi-stage hydraulic fracturing. Several projects test the economic viability of extracting bitumen from the Grosmont Formation.

== Distribution ==
The Woodbend Group reaches a maximum thickness of 700 metres (2,300 ft) in northern Alberta (where reefs were developed), and has typical thickness of 300 metres (980 ft) in southern and central Alberta. It extends laterally from north-eastern British Columbia through Alberta and into southern Saskatchewan and southern Manitoba. Reef build-ups range in size from small mounds to pinnacle reefs and large atoll size reefs and bank developments.

== Subdivisions ==
Central Alberta

In central Alberta the following formations are recognized, from top to bottom:

Sub-unit	Age	Lithology	Max. thickness	Reference
Ireton Formation	Frasnian	upper: calcareous shale and argillaceous limestone middle: fissile grey-green shale with calcirudite beds lower: massive and banded limestone with shale partings	250 m (820 ft)	
Leduc Formation	Frasnian	shallow water reef deposits: Stromatoporoid limestone, skeletal mudstone, boundstone, floatstone, packstone and wackestone, mostly dolomitized	300 m (980 ft)	
Duvernay Formation	Frasnian	bituminous shale, calcareous shale, argillaceous limestone with disseminated pyrite	250 m (820 ft)	
Cooking Lake Formation	Frasnian	limestone (dolomite in the Rimbey-Meadowbrook reef trend)	90 m (300 ft)	

Northeast Alberta

In northeast Alberta the following formations are recognized, from top to bottom:

Sub-unit	Age	Lithology	Max. thickness	Reference
Grosmont Formation	Frasnian	limestone and dolomite, minor argillaceous dolomite, limestone, siltstone and shale	230 m (750 ft)	
Ireton Formation	Frasnian	upper: calcareous shale and argillaceous limestone middle: fissile grey-green shale with calcirudite beds lower: massive and banded limestone with shale partings	250 m (820 ft)	
Cooking Lake Formation	Frasnian	limestone: fossiliferous mudstone and wackestone, grainstone, stromatoporoid rudstone and floatstone	90 m (300 ft)	

== Relationship to other units ==
The Woodbend Group is conformably overlain by the Winterburn Group and conformably overlays the Beaverhill Lake Group. It is transgressive in the Peace River Arch and Tathlina uplift. Newer deposits rest on the Woodbend group upon an erosional surface in eastern Alberta, south-central Saskatchewan and Manitoba.

It is equivalent to the Birdbear Formation and Duperow Formation in northern Montana, southern Saskatchewan and southwestern Manitoba, as well as parts of the Fort Simpson Formation and Muskwa Formation of northeastern British Columbia and southern Yukon, while it corresponds to the Tathlina Formation, Twin Falls Formation and Hay River Formation in the Northwest Territories.
