= Fort Simpson Formation =

- Stratigraphic range: Late Devonian
- Type: Geological formation
- Underlies: Jean Marie Member of the Redknife Formation
- Overlies: Muskwa Member of the Horn River Formation
- Thickness: up to 1,000 metres (3,280 ft)

Lithology
- Primary: Shale

Location
- Coordinates: 61°07′30″N 120°22′30″W
- Region: Alberta; British Columbia; Northwest Territories
- Country: Canada

Type section
- Named for: Fort Simpson, Northwest Territories
- Named by: A.E. Cameron, 1918

The Fort Simpson Formation is a stratigraphic unit of Devonian age in the Western Canadian Sedimentary Basin.

It takes the name from the settlement of Fort Simpson, and was first described in well Briggs Turkey Lake No. 1 (located south-east of Fort Simpson) by A.E. Cameron in 1918.

== Lithology ==
The Fort Simpson Formation is composed of grey shale and mudstone. The shale can be calcareous, silty or sandy.

== Distribution ==
The Fort Simpson Formation reaches a thickness of over 1,000 metres (3,280 ft) in the sub-surface of the Mackenzie River plain. It extends from northern Alberta to south-western northwest Territories and in north-eastern British Columbia (north of Peace River Arch).

== Relationship to other units ==
The Fort Simpson Formation is overlain by the Jean Marie Member of the Redknife Formation in its eastern reaches, and progressively by the Kakisa Formation, Trout River Formation or Tetcho Formation towards the west. It is conformably underlain by the Muskwa Member of the Horn River Formation.

It is replaced by the Besa River Formation in the Liard River area. It is equivalent to the Imperial Formation to the north, the Tathlina Formation, Twin Falls Formation and Hay River Formation to the east, and the Woodbend Group in Alberta.
