= Redknife Formation =

Geologic formation in Canada

- Stratigraphic range: Late Devonian
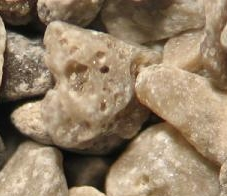
- Jean-Marie Limestone
- Type: Geological formation
- Sub-units: Jean Marie Member
- Underlies: Kakisa Formation
- Overlies: Fort Simpson Formation
- Thickness: up to 83 feet (30 m)

Lithology
- Primary: Shale, limestone
- Other: siltstone, dolomite

Location
- Coordinates: 61.28°N 119.87°W
- Region: Northwest Territories; British Columbia; Alberta
- Country: Canada

Type section
- Named for: Redknife River
- Named by: Belyea and McLaren, 1962

The Redknife Formation is a stratigraphic unit of Devonian age in the Western Canadian Sedimentary Basin.

It takes the name from Redknife River, a tributary of the Mackenzie River, and was first described in the banks of the Trout River, north of Trout Lake, Northwest Territories, at Table Rock Rapids by Belyea and McLaren in 1962.

== Lithology ==
The Redknife Formation is divided into the Jean Marie Member (base) and an upper unnamed shale unit. The Jean Marie Member is composed of argillaceous, silty and dolomitic fossiliferous limestone. The carbonates are massive east of Fort Nelson and west of the Alberta border. The upper Redknife consists of calcareous shales with silty limestone and siltstone interbeds. To the south and east, the shales grade into limestone and siltstone, and it becomes dolomitic in the Peace River arch.

The Redknife formation contains common coral and brachiopod fossils.

=== Oil/gas production ===
Gas is produced from the Jean Marie Member in the Greater Sierra filed east of Fort Nelson, British Columbia.

== Distribution ==
The Redknife Formation occurs in outcrops in the southern Northwest Territories and in the sub-surface in north-eastern British Columbia, also reaching into north-western Alberta. The maximum thickness of the upper shales is 79 feet (20 m), and the lower carbonates are up to 15 feet (0 m). The Jean Marie Member is found in outcrops south of the Mackenzie River between Kakisa and Blackstone River. It grades westwards into the shale facies of the Fort Simpson Formation. East of the Peace River Arch it turns into the carbonates of the Kakisa Formation.

== Relationship to other units ==
The Redknife Formation is conformly overlain by the Kakisa Formation and overlies the Tathlina Formation in northern Alberta and the Fort Simpson Formation in British Columbia and Northwest Territories. The Fort Simpson Formation replaces the Redknife Formation to the west. The Redknife Formation can be correlated with the Nisku Formation and upper part of the Ireton Formation in central Alberta.

=== Subdivisions ===
The Jean Marie Member is designated as the lower part of the Redknife Formation where it is represented by massive limestone or silty carbonates. The Jean Marie Member was deposited during the Frasnian age. It is named for the Jean Marie River.
