= Beaverhill Lake Group =

- Stratigraphic range: Middle to Late Devonian ~390–365 Ma
- Type: Geological formation
- Sub-units: Swan Hills Formation; Waterways Formation; Slave Point Formation; Fort Vermilion Formation
- Underlies: Woodbend Group and Muskwa Formation
- Overlies: Elk Point Group
- Thickness: up to 220 metres (720 ft)

Lithology
- Primary: Calcareous shale, limestone
- Other: Dolomite, anhydrite

Location
- Coordinates: 53.30142°N 112.3908°W
- Region: Northwest Territories, British Columbia, Alberta
- Country: Canada

Type section
- Named for: Beaverhill Lake
- Named by: Imperial Oil staff, 1950

The Beaverhill Lake Group is a geologic unit of Middle Devonian to Late Devonian (late Givetian to Frasnian) age in the Western Canada Sedimentary Basin that is present in the southwestern Northwest Territories, northeastern British Columbia and Alberta. It was named by the geological staff of Imperial Oil in 1950 for Beaverhill Lake, Alberta, based on the core from a well that they had drilled southeast of the lake, near Ryley, Alberta (Anglo-Canadian Beaverhill Lake No. 2, 11-11-50-17W4).

Petroleum is produced from the Swan Hills Formation of the Beaverhill Lake Group in the Swan Hills area of northern Alberta.

== Lithology ==
The Beaverhill Lake Group consists of anhydrite and carbonate rocks at the base (the Fort Vermillion Formation), overlain by interbedded sequences of calcareous shale, argillaceous micritic limestone, limestone and dolomite. The group becomes thicker and more shaly to the west.

== Distribution and thickness ==
The Beaverhill Lake Group is present beneath the plains of the southwestern Northwest Territories, northeastern British Columbia and Alberta. It reaches a maximum thickness of about 220 metres (720 ft) in central Alberta. Outcrops of one of its formations (the Waterways) can be seen along the Athabasca and Clearwater Rivers in the Fort McMurray area.

== Stratigraphy ==
Central Alberta

Sub-unit	Age	Lithology	Max thickness	Reference
Waterways Formation, Mildred Member	Late Devonian	argillaceous limestone and shale	42.7 m (140 ft)	
Waterways Formation, Moberly Member	Middle Devonian to Late Devonian	grey, fine-grained, thin bedded limestone, fossiliferous limestone	95.7 m (310 ft)	
Waterways Formation, Christina Member	Middle Devonian to Late Devonian	green calcareous shale and argillaceous limestone with brachiopods	27.4 m (90 ft)	
Waterways Formation, Calmut Member	Middle Devonian to Late Devonian	fine-grained argillaceous limestone with olive green shale and brachiopods	31.1 m (100 ft)	
Waterways Formation, Firebag Member	Middle Devonian to Late Devonian	green calcareous shale and minor argillaceous limestone with brachiopods	61 m (200 ft)	
Slave Point Formation	Middle Devonian	limestone interbedded with fine- to coarse-crystalline dolomite, minor shale laminae	120 m (390 ft)	
Fort Vermilion Formation	Middle Devonian	brown to white anhydrite with interbeds of dolomite or limestone	37 m (120 ft)	

Swan Hills area

Sub-unit	Age	Lithology	Max thickness	Reference
Swan Hills Formation	Middle Devonian to Late Devonian	stromatoporoid reef (micritic and pelletoidal limestone facies or coarse, porous, bioclastic limestone facies)	152 m (500 ft)	
Waterways Formation	Middle Devonian to Late Devonian	nodular and argillaceous limestone and shale with brachiopods, corals and ostracods	230 m (750 ft)	
Fort Vermilion Formation	Middle Devonian	brown to white anhydrite with interbeds of dolomite or limestone	8 m (30 ft)	

In northern Alberta and northeastern British Columbia the unit has formation status and is not subdivided.

== Environment of deposition ==
The formations of the Beaverhill Lake Group were deposited in an embayment that extended from an open ocean in the present-day Northwest Territories in Canada, to North Dakota in the United States. An extensive reef complex called the Presqu'ile Barrier had developed across the mouth of the embayment, blocking it from the open ocean and restricting the inflow of sea water. Low water levels and excessive evaporation led to the deposition of the anhydrite-rich Fort Vermillion Formation at the base of the group in northern areas. Water levels then increased throughout the embayment, and the overlying carbonate rocks were deposited in reefs (Swan Hills Formation), and in carbonate platform and basin environments (Waterways Formation).

== Relationship to other units ==
The Beaverhill Lake Group is conformably underlain by the formations of the Elk Point Group. In most areas it is conformably overlain by the formations of the Woodbend Group, and in northwestern Alberta and northeastern British Columbia it is disconformably overlain by the Muskwa Formation.

It is equivalent to the Souris River Formation in southeastern Alberta, Saskatchewan and Manitoba, and to the Flume Formation of the Fairholme Group in the Canadian Rockies. According to D.L Griffin, it is equivalent to the Slave Point Formation and Waterways Formation in northeastern Alberta, with the Slave Point Formation and the lower Hay River Formation in the District of Mackenzie, as well as the Horn River Formation and Fort Simpson Formation northwest of the Slave Point-Keg River facies in northeastern British Columbia and the Northwest Territories.

== Paleontology ==
The carbonate rocks of the Beaverhill Lake Group contain rich brachiopod faunas. There are also crinoids, ostracods and corals, and, in the Swan Hills Formation, stromatoporoids.

== Hydrocarbon production ==
Since 1957 oil has been produced from the Swan Hills Formation of the Beaverhill Lake Group in the Swan Hills area of northern Alberta, where it includes Devonian reef structures similar to those of the Leduc Formation and the Rainbow Member in Alberta.
