= Trout River Formation =

- Stratigraphic range: Late Devonian
- Type: Geological formation
- Underlies: Tetcho Formation
- Overlies: Kakisa Formation; Fort Simpson Formation
- Thickness: up to 91 metres (300 ft)

Lithology
- Primary: Limestone
- Other: Shale, siltstone

Location
- Coordinates: 61.22°N 119.90°W
- Region: Northwest Territories; British Columbia
- Country: Canada

Type section
- Named for: Trout River
- Named by: C.H. Crickmay, 1953

The Trout River Formation is a stratigraphic unit of Late Devonian age in the Western Canadian Sedimentary Basin.

It takes the name from the Trout River, and was first described on the banks of the river, 35 kilometres (22 mi) upstream from the Mackenzie River, by C.H. Crickmay in 1953.

== Lithology ==
The Trout River Formation is composed bedded limestone (top), silty limestone and shale (middle), silty limestone and calcareous siltstone (base).

Brachiopod and coral paleo-fauna can be found in outcrops.

== Distribution ==
The Trout River Formation reaches a maximum thickness of 91 metres (300 ft). It occurs in the District of Mackenzie in outcrop and dips south into the Fort Nelson area in north-eastern British Columbia.

== Relationship to other units ==
The Trout River Formation is conformably overlain by the Tetcho Formation and disconformably overlays the Kakisa Formation. In its western extent, it overlies and grades into the Fort Simpson Formation.

It is equivalent to the Sassenach Formation in the central Alberta Rockies, with the Graminia Formation in central Alberta, the Crowfoot Formation in southern Alberta, the Torquay Formation in Saskatchewan and Lyleton Formation in Manitoba.
