= Kotcho Formation =

- Stratigraphic range: Middle Famennian
- Type: Geological formation
- Underlies: Exshaw Formation
- Overlies: Tetcho Formation
- Thickness: up to 210.9 metres (690 ft)

Lithology
- Primary: Shale
- Other: Limestone

Location
- Coordinates: 60.15500°N 121.30444°W
- Region: British Columbia, Northwest Territories
- Country: Canada

Type section
- Named for: Kotcho Lake
- Named by: H.R. Belyea, D.J. McLaren, 1962

The Kotcho Formation is a stratigraphic unit of middle Famennian age in the Western Canadian Sedimentary Basin.

It takes the name from Kotcho Lake and was first described in the Imperial Island River No. 1 by H.R. Belyea and D.J. McLaren in 1962.

== Lithology ==
The Kotcho Formation is composed of green-grey shale, locally bituminous, with thin argillaceous limestone beds or lenses.

== Distribution ==
The Kotcho Formation reaches a maximum thickness of 210.9 metres (690 ft).It is up to 30 metres (100 ft) thick in the Fort Nelson area, and thins down southwards, disappearing completely on the northern flank of the Peace River Arch.

== Relationship to other units ==
The Kotcho Formation is overlain by the Exshaw Formation and conformably overlays the Tetcho Formation.

To the east, it grades into the upper Wabamun Group carbonate, and to the south-west into the Palliser Formation. To the east it is replaced by the Besa River Formation shale.
