= Banff Formation =

Geologic formation in Canada

- Stratigraphic range: Famennian–Tournaisian
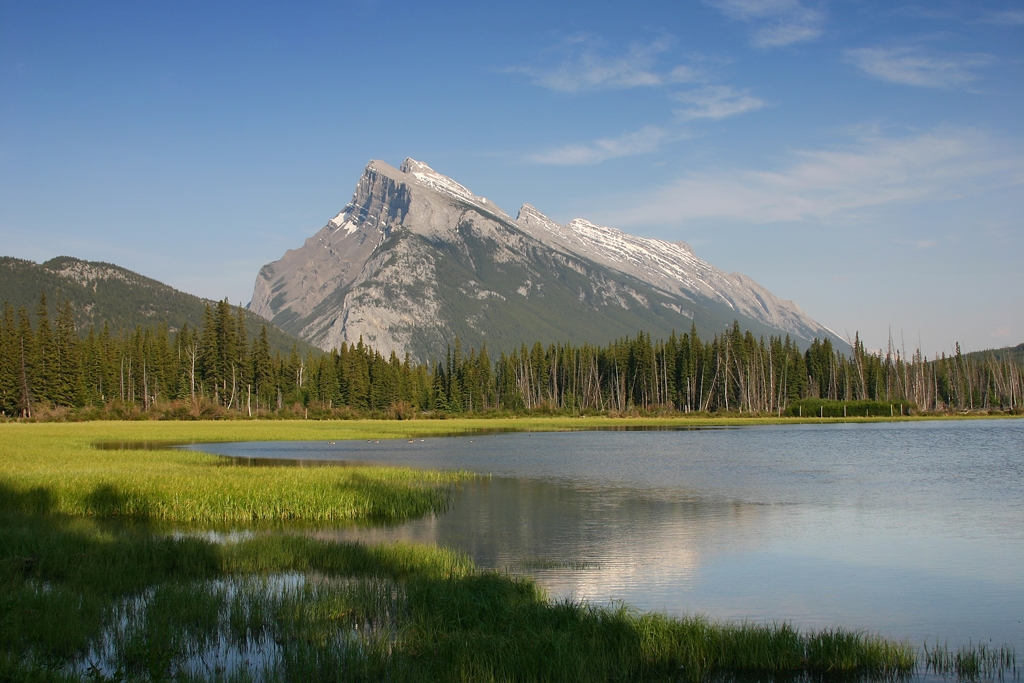
- The Banff Formation is visible on the eastern (left) slope of Mount Rundle.
- Type: Geological formation
- Sub-units: Members A to F
- Underlies: Pekisko Formation, Livingstone Formation
- Overlies: Palliser Formation, Wabamun Formation, Exshaw Formation
- Thickness: up to 400 metres (1,310 ft)

Lithology
- Primary: Shale, limestone
- Other: Chert, sandstone, siltstone

Location
- Coordinates: 51°09′54″N 115°31′08″W
- Region: Alberta, British Columbia
- Country: Canada

Type section
- Named for: Banff, Alberta
- Named by: E.M. Kindle, 1924

The Banff Formation is a stratigraphic unit of Devonian age in the Western Canada Sedimentary Basin.

It takes the name from the town of Banff, Alberta, and was first described on the north-west slope of Mount Rundle, near Banff by E.M. Kindle in 1924.

== Lithology ==
The Banff Formation is composed of shale and marlstone in the base, chert and limestone in the middle, sandstone, siltstone and shale at the top.

== Distribution ==
The Banff Formation extends from the 49th parallel in southern Alberta and the Kootenays region of British Columbia to north-eastern British Columbia, northern Alberta and the District of Mackenzie in the Northwest Territories. In its southern area, the thickness ranges from 400 feet (120 m) in the Rocky Mountains to 150 feet (50 m) in the sub-surface of the prairies. In the north, it ranges from 450 feet (140 m) in the Peace River Country to 450 feet (140 m) in northern Alberta.

The age of the formation ranges from late Famennian to Tournaisian.

== Relationship to other units ==
The Banff Formation is overlies the Palliser Formation in the Canadian Rockies, the Wabamun Formation in central Alberta, the Exshaw Formation in southern Alberta and in the Fort Nelson area. It is overlain by the Pekisko Formation and the Livingstone Formation in north-central and southern Alberta respectively, and it is followed by the Shunda Formation in north-eastern British Columbia. An unconformity is observed between Banff and the Rundle Group in outcrop.

The Banff Formation is equivalent to the Lodgepole Formation in Montana. It can be correlated with the Besa River Formation in north-eastern British Columbia. In the southeastern Rocky Mountains, part of the formation passes laterally into the Pekisko Formation.
