= Kakisa River =

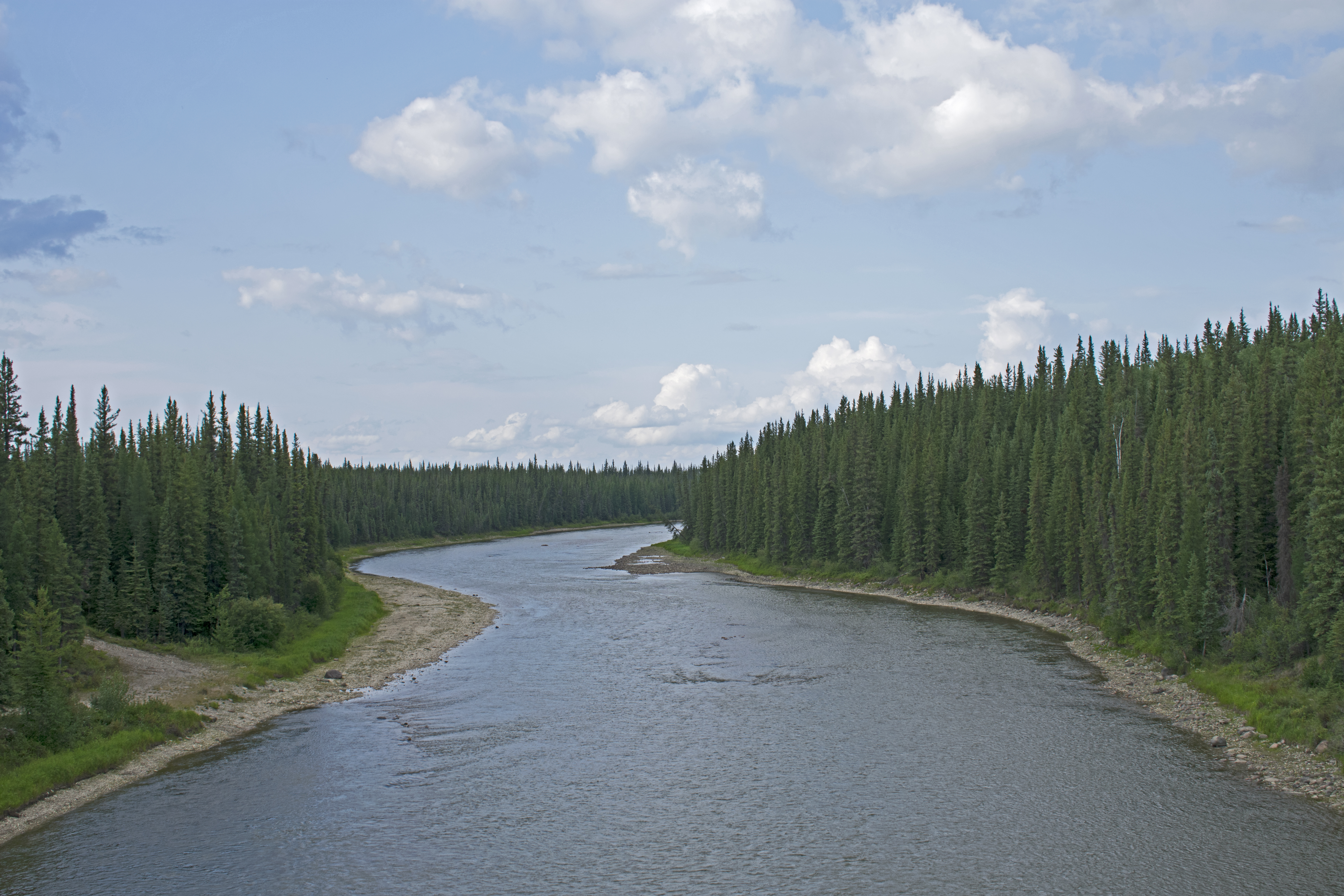
- The Kakisa River from the bridge of Mackenzie Highway

Location
- Country: Canada
- Provinces: Alberta and Northwest Territories

Physical characteristics
- Source
  - location: Creighton Lake
  - coordinates: 59.95244°N 119.45824°W
  - elevation: 570 meters (1,870 ft)
- Mouth
  - location: Mackenzie River
  - coordinates: 61.06550°N 117.15901°W
  - elevation: 160 meters (520 ft)

The Kakisa River is a major tributary of the Mackenzie River in the Northwest Territories of Canada.

The river gives the name to the Kakisa Formation, a stratigraphical unit of the Western Canadian Sedimentary Basin.

== Course ==
The Kakisa River originates in northern Alberta, immediately south of the Northwest Territories border, from Creighton Lake, at an elevation of 570 meters (1,870 ft). It flows westwards, briefly crossing into the Northwest Territories, then back into Alberta. 3 kilometers (1.9 mi) east of the British Columbia border it turns north and flows back in the Northwest Territories. It keeps a north to northeast direction, paralleling the Redknife River for a while, then turns east, where it builds a complex lake and channel system before it empties into the Tathlina Lake at its western extremity. It flows out the north side of the lake and continues north, receives the waters of Gull Creek, then flows into the Kakisa Lake at its southern shore. It flows out at the eastern side of the lake, drops through the Lady Evelyn Falls before it is crossed by the Mackenzie Highway. It continues northwards, then empties into the Mackenzie River, 30 kilometers (19 mi) downstream from the Great Slave Lake, at an elevation of 160 meters (520 ft).

== Tributaries ==
- Tathlina Lake
- Gull Creek
- Kakisa Lake

== See also ==
- List of rivers of Alberta
- List of rivers of the Northwest Territories
