= Leduc No. 1 =

1947 crude oil discovery in Alberta, Canada

Coordinates: 53.32957°N 113.72528°W

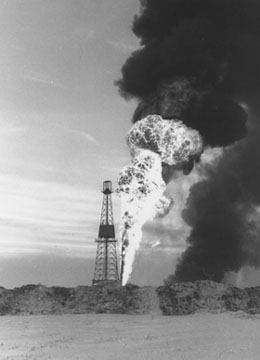
- Leduc #1 well
- Interactive map of Leduc No. 1
- Type: crude oil discovery in Alberta, Canada
- Location: Alberta, Canada
- Nearest city: Leduc County

History
- Established: 1990
- Built: 1946

Site notes
- Governing body: Parks Canada
- Website: http://www.canadianenergymuseum.ca/

National Historic Site of Canada

Leduc No. 1 was a major crude oil discovery made near Leduc, Alberta, Canada, on February 13, 1947. It provided the geological key to Alberta's most prolific conventional oil reserves and resulted in a boom in petroleum exploration and development across Western Canada. The discovery transformed the Alberta economy; oil and gas supplanted farming as the primary industry and resulted in the province becoming one of the richest in the country. Nationally, the discovery allowed Canada to become self-sufficient within a decade and ultimately a major exporter of oil.

The discovery followed years of exploratory failures throughout the province. Imperial Oil had spent millions of dollars drilling 133 dry holes in the previous years as only minor discoveries were made. Leduc No. 1 discovered that oil was trapped in what became known as the Nisku Formation and resulted in numerous major discoveries across the prairies. Leduc No. 1 produced 317,000 barrels (50,400 m^{3}) of oil and 323 million cubic feet (9,100,000 m^{3}) of natural gas before it was decommissioned in 1974, and was part of the Leduc-Woodbend oilfield that has produced over 300 million barrels (48,000,000 m^{3}) of oil total.

Billions of investment dollars flowed into Alberta and were followed by massive immigration to the province following the discovery. Alberta's two major cities saw their populations double within a few years. Calgary grew into a major financial centre and within two decades had the highest number of millionaires in Canada, per capita. The provincial capital of Edmonton, immediately northeast of the discovery, became a major petroleum production centre. A farming community with fewer than 900 residents in 1947, Leduc grew to become Alberta's 13th largest city, while several towns, including Devon and Swan Hills, were founded to support workers in the oil and gas industry.

== Background ==
Oil was known to exist in Alberta for many centuries. First Nations peoples used it to pitch canoes and to act as a medicinal ointment. European immigrants to southern Alberta in the late 19th century noticed that an oily film occasionally covered pools of water, and that the air had unusual odours at times. In 1911, Canadian William Herron identified the nature of the odours from his time working in oil fields in Pennsylvania. He convinced Calgary businessman Archibald Dingman and Member of Parliament R. B. Bennett to visit the site near Turner Valley. The trio gathered four other investors, formed the Calgary Petroleum Products Company, Ltd. and began developing the region in search of oil. The company drilled three wells beginning in 1913, and on May 14, 1914, the third struck a significant reserve at a depth of 820 metres (2,690 ft). Excitement reached a fevered pitch in Calgary once word of the Turner Valley strike reached town. Over 500 oil exploration companies were formed within days, the majority of which existed only to bilk unwitting citizens by selling shares in companies that owned no land and had no intention of drilling for oil.

In fact, oil was not discovered initially, but rather wet natural gas that yielded liquid naphtha upon reaching the surface, and Calgary settled into an economic recession that accompanied the outset of the First World War. A second major natural gas discovery brought renewed interest in 1924 when the Royalite No. 4 well blew in with a mammoth fire that burned uncontrolled for nearly a month. This find was made at a depth of 1,140 metres (3,740 ft). The new discovery resulted in the drilling of hundreds of wells in the region over the next 20 years. The first major crude oil discovery at Turner Valley was made in 1936 at a depth of 2,080 metres (6,820 ft), the deepest well in Alberta at the time. The Turner Valley oil field reached a peak production of 10 million barrels (1,600,000 m^{3}) in 1942, four years after it was recognized as the largest oil field in the British Empire.

In the 30 years following the initial discovery of 1914, oil companies spent over $150 million on exploration and development but found no major reserves of note. The provincial government resorted to subsidies and tax relief for companies to encourage further exploration. Imperial Oil alone had drilled 133 wildcat wells throughout the province, all of which failed to yield significant quantities of oil. By the mid-1940s, the company neared the decision of abandoning the search for oil in the province in favour of focusing on the production of synthetic gasoline out of natural gas. While the majority of the company's efforts drilled down only into Cretaceous levels where the Turner Valley strike was discovered, some of Imperial's geologists believed that greater reserves could be found deeper below the earth's surface. They convinced the company's technical committee to attempt one more deep drilling effort. Imperial's board of directors reluctantly supported the new effort, but made it known that this well, initially known as Wildcat No. 134, would be the company's last-chance effort.

== Discovery ==
Imperial's chief geologist, Ted Link, was among those who believed oil could be found at a much greater depth and had already met with success drilling at Norman Wells in the Northwest Territories. He had his staff determine the best location for the new well. The majority of the team favoured a triangular area that stretched between Calgary and Edmonton in central Alberta, up to Grande Prairie in the northwest. The company then set out to acquire surface lease rights to tracts of land in the region. Imperial acquired rights to over 810 km^{2} (200,000 acres) of land southwest of Edmonton by the end of spring and began surveying the area for the best place to begin drilling. Seismic tests produced two possible candidates: one near the village of Leduc and another farther to the southwest near Pigeon Lake.

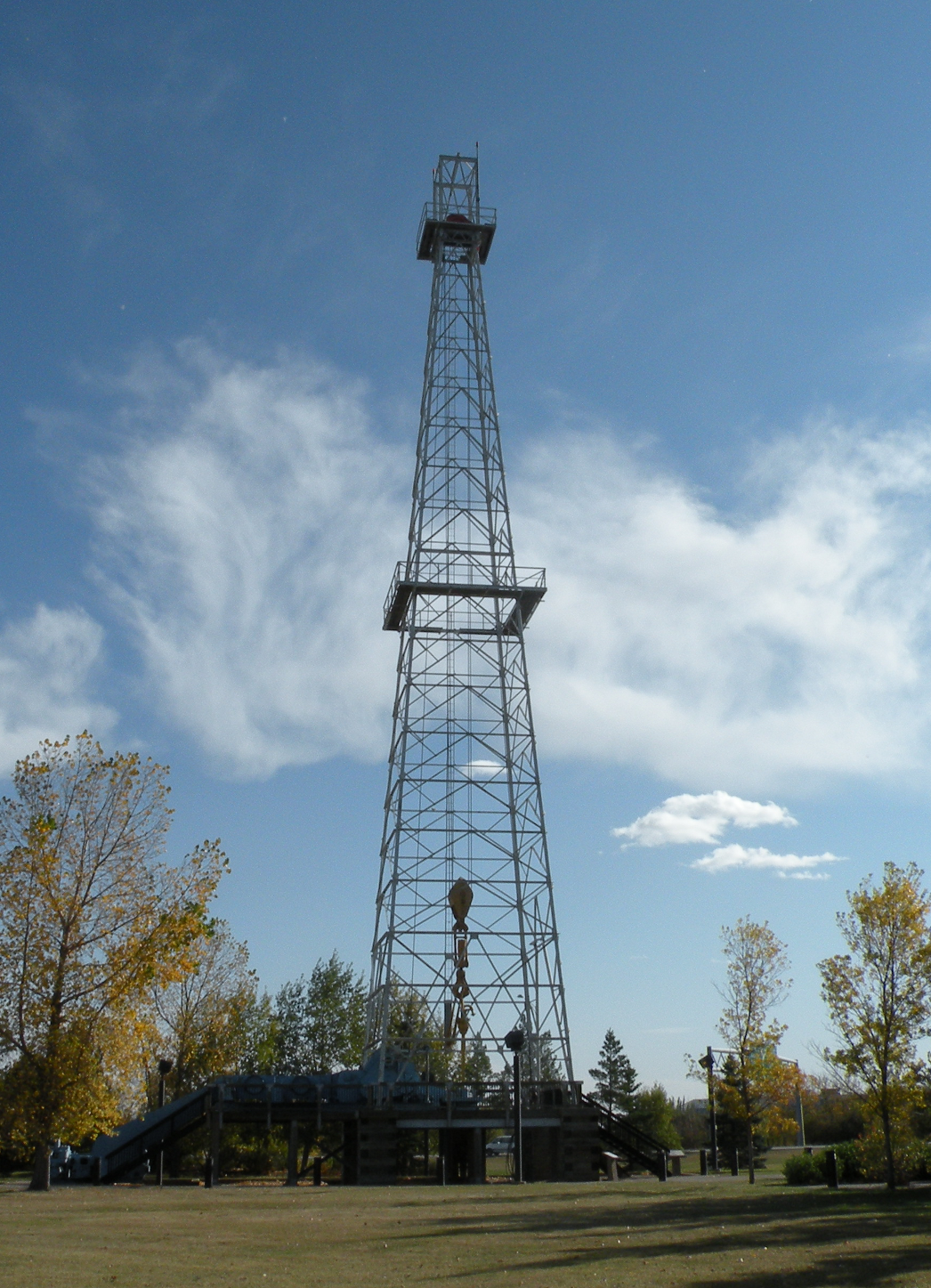
The derrick used to drill Leduc No. 1 currently stands on display at the Canadian Energy Museum, a few hundred metres west of the original drill site.

Though the Pigeon Lake spot was viewed by geologists as a more promising location, the team chose Leduc due to the location's proximity to major roadways and the North Saskatchewan River. This decision proved fortuitous, as a later effort by Imperial to drill at Pigeon Lake resulted in another dry hole.

The farmstead of Mike Turta, 15 km west of Leduc, was chosen as the drilling site. As Turta lacked mineral rights, Imperial initially paid him only $250 per year to lease his land. Imperial brought Vern Hunter, nicknamed "Dry Hole" as a result of his numerous past failures, to lead the drilling team. Hunter was skeptical that the new site would lead to success. He expected it would fail like previous ventures and that Imperial would then limit its focus to Alberta's natural gas fields. The drilling site was a true wildcat – no other wells drilled within 80 kilometres (50 mi) of Turta's farm – and Imperial was willing to go as deep as 2,100 metres (6,900 ft) in this search.

Drilling of Leduc No. 1 began November 20, 1946. Several drill stem tests down to depths of 1,200 metres (3,900 ft) showed only traces of oil and natural gas. As drilling passed into Mesozoic depths, tests indicated large quantities of natural gas and some oil. It was a small find, and close to the limits of Paleozoic rocks, where conventional wisdom of the time held that oil was unlikely to be found. Imperial was left to choose whether to begin production of this small find, or drill deeper and risk having the byproducts of drilling ruin the company's ability to complete a well at the depth of this find. Imperial chose to continue drilling. When drilling reached 1,536 metres (5,039 ft), into Devonian rocks, tests showed promising results. On February 3, 1947, a test sent a geyser shooting out of the drilling hole and up half the height of the drilling derrick, covering a worker with oil.

By this point, Imperial knew they had hit upon a strike. The company pressed Hunter to name a date when the well could come in. He later stated: "The crew and I were experts at abandoning wells but we didn't know much about completing them. I named February 13 and started praying." Imperial invited the public to witness as the well came in. However, the machinery broke down on that morning. The crew worked most of the day trying to fix the machinery, while some of guests began to leave, fearing another disappointment. Shortly before 4 p.m., the crew finally cleared the wellhead and the 500 people who remained despite the bitter cold bore witness as Leduc No. 1 came to life. People felt a rumbling in the ground, while roughnecks opened release valves. The youngest member of the crew was given the honour of "flaring" the well. As the mixture of crude oil and gas spewed from a release pipe, the young man hurled a burning sack onto the mixture, igniting the fuel and sending flames 15 metres (50 ft) into the air. Imperial held a party in Edmonton that night in celebration of its achievement.

=== Geologic breakthrough ===
The discovery at Leduc was actually a stroke of good fortune because geologists had chosen the location on the basis of hypotheses that were later shown to be incorrect. The search for large oil reservoirs in Alberta had been ongoing for decades because the Western Canada Sedimentary Basin that lies beneath the majority of the Canadian Prairies was known to be prime ground for the formation of petroleum and natural gas, and it was unlikely that such a prime setting would have produced only the two oil fields that were known to exist in 1946.

At that time, geologists believed that rocks of Early Cretaceous age had the greatest potential to contain oil and natural gas, and the Leduc area appeared to be a good location from which to reach those rocks. Earlier discoveries in Texas and at Norman Wells in the Northwest Territories had shown that oil could also be found in Devonian reefs, but the prevailing opinion was that Alberta had been a desert at that time so such reefs were unlikely to be present. It was later shown that much of Alberta was actually a marine basin fringed by reefs and lagoons during the Late Devonian and was therefore very likely to host porous, hydrocarbon-containing reefs like those at Norman Wells. The understanding of the Norman Wells field, which Imperial had located in the 1920s, helped provide the geological key to unlock Leduc, and twenty years after the initial discovery at Leduc No. 1, dozens of oil-bearing Devonian reefs had been discovered throughout western Canada.

=== Leduc-Woodbend oil field ===
Imperial had already begun testing for a second well, 2.4 kilometres (1.5 mi) to the southwest of Leduc No. 1. Leduc No. 2 was spudded on February 12, 1947. By May it had reached the same depth as No. 1 but little oil was found. The company worried that Leduc was only a minor oil field, but decided to continue to drill deeper. At a depth of 1,640 metres (5,380 ft), the well broke through into a reservoir even larger than the one at Leduc No. 1. Leduc No. 3 came in on the same day, May 21, 1947, ushering in Alberta's oil boom. Within weeks, more than a dozen companies were drilling throughout the region, and by the end of 1947 there were 31 operational wells in the area, 24 of them owned by Imperial Oil.

The depth at which Leduc No. 1 struck oil was designated the Devonian D-2, formally called the Nisku Formation, while Nos. 2 and 3 had reached the Devonian D-3, or Leduc Formation. However, it was still many years before the nature of the Devonian reefs was fully understood. In 1949, the majority of wells drilled were dry; only 26 of 107 wildcat wells drilled that year became producers of oil or gas.

Other major discoveries followed Leduc. A second field called Woodbend was discovered by Imperial north of the initial find. The two fields were combined to form the Leduc-Woodbend oil field, and within a decade it was the third largest oil field in Canada. Imperial discovered a larger field northeast of Edmonton near the village of Redwater in 1948. Gulf Canada discovered a major field near Stettler in the central part of the province in 1950. In 1951, Texaco made two significant discoveries in the area around Wizard Lake, immediately south of Leduc-Woodbend. The Pembina oil field, the largest in Alberta, was discovered in 1953 near the town of Drayton Valley.

== Production ==
Canada produced only 21,000 barrels (3,300 m^{3}) of oil per day in 1946, most of it in Turner Valley, but consumed ten times that amount. Alberta's annual total production in 1946 was 7.7 million barrels (1,220,000 m^{3}) from 416 wells. Over ninety percent of the nation's oil requirements were imported from the United States. One decade later, Canada was producing sixty-five percent natively, despite a three-fold increase in consumption. Overall production had increased to nearly 144 million barrels (22,900,000 m^{3}) from 7,390 productive wells, and Alberta produced 400,000 barrels (64,000 m^{3}) per day with the capability of doubling that total.

The discoveries led to rapidly increasing estimates of Western Canada's reserves. The region was estimated to have 72 million barrels (11,400,000 m^{3}) recoverable in 1946. That figure was increased to 3 billion barrels (0.48 km^{3}) in 1957. It was estimated in 2010 that Western Canada had as much as 77 billion barrels (12.2 km^{3}) of oil in conventional reserves (i.e., excluding the Athabasca Oil Sands), though the vast majority of that total was unrecoverable by the technology of the time.

Drilling activity in the Leduc-Woodbend field peaked in 1951 and exploratory drilling of the field had largely ended by 1955. The field produced 4.7 million barrels (750,000 m^{3}) of oil in 1948, surpassing total production of Turner Valley within one year. The field peaked at over 20 million barrels (3,200,000 m^{3}) annually between 1953 and 1956 before gradually declining. Overall, the Leduc-Woodbend field produced over 250 million barrels (40,000,000 m^{3}) in its first 50 years of operation. Leduc No. 1 itself was operational until 1974. During its 27-year lifespan, the well produced 317,000 barrels (50,400 m^{3}) of oil and over 323 million cubic feet (9,100,000 m^{3}) of natural gas.

== Impact ==
=== Population growth ===
My generation knows if we didn't have Leduc and its consequences, we probably would be living elsewhere.

— Peter Lougheed, Premier of Alberta 1971–1985

The discovery of Leduc No. 1 led to a rapid population boom in Alberta. The 1948 blowout of the nearby Atlantic No. 3 well aided provincial growth as the derrick collapse and resulting inferno made international headlines and alerted the world to Alberta's oil strikes. Alberta's population in 1946 was 803,000, compared to neighbouring Saskatchewan's total of 833,000. At the 1951 census, Alberta's population had grown to 940,000 while Saskatchewan remained stagnant. The 1951 census also made note of the transformation the province was undergoing, as the urban population outnumbered the rural for the first time in the province's history. Alberta's population grew by another 400,000 throughout the 1950s.

The Government of Alberta attempted to manage growth and hoped to prevent the risk of so-called resource towns from turning into ghost towns once the oil boom passed them by, as had happened to turn-of-the-century coal mining towns across the province. The planned town of Devon, located west of Edmonton, was founded in 1949 by Imperial Oil with the assistance of the province to provide housing and services for workers of the Leduc-Woodbend oil field. Drayton Valley was the province's first model oil town as the government organized the rapid growth the hamlet of less than 100 people experienced beginning in 1954 following the discovery of the nearby Pembina oil field the year previous. Similar communities followed, including Swan Hills, which incorporated as a town in 1967.

=== Calgary and Edmonton ===
The already intense rivalry between the cities of Calgary and Edmonton increased following the discovery at Leduc No. 1 as both communities attempted to proclaim themselves the "oil capital of Canada". Edmonton, it was said, would have been only a "quiet administrative centre" if not for the discoveries made in the regions surrounding the city. The city became increasingly blue collar following Leduc as oil workers moved into the city. The city's population rose rapidly; Edmonton's 226,000 residents in 1956 was double that of the census ten years previous, while the city grew by an additional 55,000 by 1961. Edmonton has become one of the world's premier operations and service centres for the petroleum industry. It has fabrication and manufacturing capacity that would be the envy of virtually any other oilfield service centre. The University of Alberta is a jewel in the city's crown, and it has been a centre of oilsands research since the 1920s.

The area is Alberta's refining and petrochemical centre – notably the "Industrial Heartland" northeast of Edmonton. That industrial region has grown organically since the late 1940s, when Imperial Oil brought a tin-pot World War II refinery down from Whitehorse to process crude from Leduc and the other new fields. Now the beneficiary of more than $25 billion in investment, this 582-square-kilometre region hosts 40 large companies and many small ones. Together they operate refineries and petrochemical plants, an upgrader, pipelines, service companies and numerous other interdependent businesses.

However, while many petroleum-related workers and facilities are now located in Edmonton, corporate offices remained in Calgary. Many oil companies had placed their offices in the southern city following the Turner Valley discovery and made no effort to relocate even as drilling and exploration moved north. Consequently, the oil money flowed through Calgary. By 1967, the city had more millionaires than any other in the country, per capita, and more cars per person than any city in the world. Today it is possible to imagine Calgary – which has the planet's greatest concentration of energy-related knowledge in its downtown core – becoming a serious rival to Houston as the energy capital of the world.

== Canadian Energy Museum ==
Leduc No. 1 and the Leduc-Woodbend oil field were designated a National Historic Site in 1990. The Leduc #1 Energy Discovery Centre opened in 1997 and features exhibits about Canada's oil industry, including artifacts, photos and oilfield equipment. In 2019, the centre was rebranded as the Canadian Energy Museum, with a broader focus on the Canadian energy industry as a whole. CEM is owned and operated by the Devon/Leduc Oilfield Historical Society.

== See also ==
- History of the petroleum industry in Canada
