= Saskatchewan Group =

- Stratigraphic range: Frasnian
- Type: Geological group
- Sub-units: Birdbear Formation; Duperow Formation
- Underlies: Three Forks Group
- Overlies: Manitoba Group
- Thickness: up to 350 metres (1,150 ft)

Lithology
- Primary: Carbonate
- Other: Evaporite

Location
- Coordinates: 50.355°N 106.902°W
- Region: WCSB; Williston Basin
- Country: Canada, United States

Type section
- Named for: Saskatchewan
- Named by: A.D. Baillie, 1953

The Saskatchewan Group is a stratigraphical unit of Frasnian age in the Western Canadian Sedimentary Basin.

It takes the name from the province of Saskatchewan, and was first described in the Mobil Oil Woodley Sinclair Cantuar X-2-21 well by A.D. Baillie in 1953.

== Lithology ==
The Saskatchewan Group is composed of carbonates with thin evaporites.

== Distribution ==
The Saskatchewan Group reaches a maximum thickness of 350 metres (1,150 ft). It is present in the sub-surface throughout the Williston Basin.

== Subdivisions ==
The Saskatchewan Group contains the following formations, from top to base:

Sub-unit	Age	Lithology	Max. thickness	Reference
Birdbear Formation	Frasnian	Upper: dolomite with evaporite interbeds Lower: non-argillaceous limestone and dolomite	45 m (150 ft)	
Duperow Formation	Frasnian	limestone and dolomite, anhydrite, halite; up to 27 depositional cycles	300 m (980 ft)	

== Relationship to other units ==
The Saskatchewan Group is conformably overlain by the Three Forks Group and conformably overlays the Manitoba Group carbonates.

It is equivalent to the upper Beaverhill Lake Formation, the Woodbend Group and the lower part of the Winterburn Group in central Alberta, and with the Jefferson Group in Montana and North Dakota.
