= Duvernay Formation =

Geological formation in the Western Canadian Sedimentary Basin

- Stratigraphic range: Frasnian
- Type: Geological formation
- Unit of: Woodbend Group
- Underlies: Ireton Formation, Grosmont Formation
- Overlies: Cooking Lake Formation, Majeau Lake Formation
- Thickness: up to 250 metres (820 ft)

Lithology
- Primary: Shale
- Other: Calcarenite, mudstone

Location
- Coordinates: 53.303272°N 112.383197°W
- Region: WCSB
- Country: Canada

Type section
- Named for: Duvernay, Alberta
- Named by: Andrichuk and Wonfor
- Year defined: 1954
- Duvernay Formation (Canada)

The Duvernay Formation is a stratigraphic unit of Frasnian age in the Western Canadian Sedimentary Basin.

It was first described in well Anglo Canadian Beaverhill Lake No. 2 in LSD 11-11-50-17W4M by Imperial Oil staff in 1950. The formation was named by Andrichuk and Wonfor in 1954 for the type section in Duvernay, Alberta.

According to Canada's Alberta Energy Regulator, the Duvernay Formation "holds an estimated 443 trillion cubic feet of gas and 61.7 billion barrels of oil (Penny China Institute 2012-12)." Calgary-based, Athabasca Oil Corporation (formerly Athabasca Oil Sands Corporation), holds 640,000 acres, the largest publicly disclosed Duvernay rights.

== Lithology ==
The Duvernay Formation is composed of laminated bituminous shale, calcareous shale and dense argillaceous limestone. Pyrite disseminations are common. Calcarenite and coral rich mudstone are also present.

=== Hydrocarbon production ===
The Duvernay Formation represents the source rock for prolific reservoirs such as the Leduc reefs. Shale gas and condensate is produced from the Duvernay Formation in central Alberta using horizontal drilling and multi-stage hydraulic fracturing. $2 billion was paid for leases during 2010 and 2011. Prices for land remained high as of June, 2012 despite costs of drilling being expensive. Parts of the deposit show total organic carbon of 11%.

== Hydraulic fracturing in Canada ==
Massive hydraulic fracturing has been widely used in Alberta since the late 1970s. The method is currently used in development of the Cardium, Duvernay, Montney and Viking formations in Alberta, Bakken formation in Saskatchewan, Montney and Horn River formations in British Columbia.

== Distribution ==
The Duvernay Formation is present in the sub-surface in central Alberta. It reaches a maximum thickness of 250 metres (820 ft) east of Lesser Slave Lake.

== Relationship to other units ==
The Duvernay Formation is a unit of the Woodbend Group. It is conformably overlain by the Ireton Formation and Grosmont Formation and it conformably overlays the Cooking Lake Formation.

It is equivalent to the Leduc Formation reefs. it is equivalent to the Perdrix Formation in the Rocky Mountains, and is the stratigraphical equivalent of the Muskwa Formation in the Fort Nelson area of North-Eastern British Columbia.

== See also ==
- Encana
- PetroChina
