= Besa River Formation =

- Stratigraphic range: Givetian to Serpukhovian
- Type: Geological formation
- Underlies: Prophet Formation, Banff Formation
- Overlies: Dunedin Formation, Slave Point Formation
- Thickness: up to 1,655 metres (5,430 ft)

Lithology
- Primary: Shale
- Other: Sandstone, chert, limestone

Location
- Coordinates: 57°56′30″N 123°43′00″W
- Region: WCSB
- Country: Canada

Type section
- Named for: Besa River
- Named by: F.A. Kidd, 1963

The Besa River Formation is a stratigraphic unit of Devonian age in the Western Canadian Sedimentary Basin.

It takes the name from Besa River, a tributary of the Prophet River, and was first described in outcrop near the Muskwa River, in the Muskwa Ranges by F.A. Kidd in 1963.

== Lithology ==
The Besa River Formation is composed primarily of dark shale. Sandstone, bedded chert or limestone beds can occur at the top of the formation. The shale is slightly calcareous or siliceous and contains sponge spicules and radiolarians.

== Distribution ==
The Besa River Formation reaches a maximum thickness of 1,655 metres (5,430 ft) in the foothills . The lower Besa River Formation is faulted and folded in the Northern Rockies. It occurs in the sub-surface in east-central British Columbia, in the folded Rocky Mountain Thrust Belt and southern Mackenzie Fold Belt.

== Relationship to other units ==
The Besa River Formation is conformably overlain by the Prophet Formation or Banff Formation in its eastern extent, while to the west it is overlain by the Mattson Formation and Stoddart Group, and abruptly overlays the Dunedin Formation in the west of its extent in British Columbia, and the Slave Point Formation in the east. In the Northwest Territories, it rests on the Nahanni Formation in the east and the Road River Formation in the west.

Towards the southwest, it passes laterally into the Fort Simpson Formation and Exshaw Formation. To the south, it passes into the Dunedin Formation, Horn River Formation and Exshaw Formation. To the east it transforms into the calcareous Rundle Group and Stoddart Group. It is stratigraphically equivalent with the Fort Simpson Formation, as well as the Canol Formation and Earn Group.
