= Winterburn Group =

Stratigraphic unit in Canada

- Stratigraphic range: Frasnian
- Type: Geological group
- Sub-units: Nisku Formation, Calmar Formation, Graminia Formation, Blue Ridge Member
- Underlies: Wabamun Group
- Overlies: Ireton Formation
- Thickness: up to 150 metres (490 ft)

Lithology
- Primary: Dolomite, limestone, siltstone
- Other: Anhydrite, shale

Location
- Coordinates: 53.3451°N 113.6949°W
- Region: Alberta
- Country: Canada

Type section
- Named for: Winterburn, Edmonton
- Named by: Imperial Oil Limited, 1950

The Winterburn Group is a stratigraphic unit of Frasnian age in the Western Canadian Sedimentary Basin.

It takes the name from Winterburn area located west of Edmonton, and was first described in well P.A. Pyrcz No. 1 by Imperial Oil Limited in 1950.

== Lithology ==
The Winterburn Group is composed of silty dolomite, evaporite, argillaceous limestone, red and green siltstone, anhydrite, silty dolomite and siltstone. Pinnacle reefs develop in the Nisku Formation.

=== Hydrocarbon production ===
Oil is produced from the Nisku Formation in the Pembina oil field.

== Distribution ==
The Winterburn Group reaches a maximum thickness of 150 metres (490 ft) west of the Leduc reef system. In central Alberta it is 30 to 70m thick. It thins out over the Peace River Arch, and disappears in north-eastern British Columbia.

== Subdivisions ==
The Winterburn Group is composed, from bottom to top, of the Nisku, Calmar and Graminia Formations. The Graminia Formation includes the carbonate Blue Ridge Member west of the Rimbey-Meadowbrook reef trend.

Sub-unit	Age	Lithology	Max. thickness	Reference
Graminia Formation	Frasnian	silty dolomite, anhydrite, siltstone Blue Ridge Member: silty dolomite, siltstone	18.3 m (60 ft)	
Calmar Formation	Frasnian	dolomitic shale and siltstone, anhydrite	13.4 m (40 ft)	
Nisku Formation	Frasnian	crystalline dolomite, dolomitic siltstone, green shale, anhydrite.	100 m (330 ft)	

== Relationship to other units ==
The Winterburn Group is conformably overlain by the Wabamun Group and overlays the Ireton Formation, except in the Peace River Arch, where it rests on the Precambrian basement.

It is correlated with the Birdbear Formation and part of the Three Forks Group in Saskatchewan, with the Southesk Formation and Alexo Formation in the Canadian Rockies and with the Redknife Formation and Kakisa Formation in north-eastern British Columbia.
