= Grosmont, Alberta =

Grosmont
- Unincorporated
- Location of Grosmont in Alberta
- Coordinates: 54°51′40″N 113°33′52″W
- Country: Canada
- Province: Alberta
- Region: Northern Alberta
- Census division: 13
- Municipal district: Athabasca County

Government
  - Reeve: Doris Splane
  - Governing body: Athabasca County Council: Larry Armfelt; Christine Bilsky; Warren Griffin; Kevin Haines; Travais Johnson; Dwayne Rawson; Doris Splane; Penny Stewart; Denis Willcott
- Elevation: 610 m (2,000 ft)
- Time zone: UTC-7 (MST)
  - Summer (DST): UTC-6 (MDT)
- Website: www.athabascacounty.com

Grosmont is a locality located within Athabasca County in Alberta, Canada. It is located on Highway 2, approximately 28 kilometres (17 mi) northwest of the Town of Athabasca and 170 kilometres (110 mi) north of Edmonton. It is northwest of Island Lake and has an elevation of 610 metres (2,000 ft).

The community was so named on account of a nearby hill, Grosmont meaning "big mountain" in French. The locality shares its name with the Grosmont Formation, a stratigraphical unit of the Western Canadian Sedimentary Basin, and the Imperial Grosmont No. 1 well.

== See also ==
- List of communities in Alberta
