= Tetcho Formation =

- Stratigraphic range: Famennian
- Type: Geological formation
- Underlies: Kotcho Formation
- Overlies: Trout River Formation; Fort Simpson Formation
- Thickness: up to 75 metres (250 ft)

Lithology
- Primary: Limestone
- Other: Shale

Location
- Coordinates: 60.15500°N 121.30444°W
- Region: British Columbia; Northwest Territories
- Country: Canada

Type section
- Named for: Tetcho Lake
- Named by: H.R. Belyea, D.J. McLaren, 1962

The Tetcho Formation is a stratigraphic unit of Famennian age in the Western Canadian Sedimentary Basin.

It takes the name from Tetcho Lake, and was first described in the Imperial Island River No. 1 well (located south of Trout Lake by H.R. Belyea and D.J. McLaren in 1962.

== Lithology ==
The Tetcho Formation is composed of fine grained limestone with shale partings, silty at the base.

== Distribution ==
The Tetcho Formation reaches a maximum thickness of 75 metres (250 ft). it occurs in the sub-surface in north-eastern British Columbia and southern Northwest Territories.

== Relationship to other units ==
The Tetcho Formation is conformably overlain by the Kotcho Formation and conformably overlays the Trout River Formation and Fort Simpson Formation.

It is equivalent to the lower Wabamun Group in Alberta and to parts of the Besa River Formation in the Liard area of British Columbia.
