= Kakisa Formation =

Geologic formation in Canada

- Stratigraphic range: Frasnian
- Type: Geological formation
- Underlies: Trout River Formation
- Overlies: Redknife Formation, Fort Simpson Formation
- Thickness: up to 57 metres (190 ft)

Lithology
- Primary: Limestone

Location
- Coordinates: 60.785°N 121.077°W
- Region: British Columbia, Northwest Territories
- Country: Canada

Type section
- Named for: Kakisa River
- Named by: H.R. Belyea, D.J. McLaren, 1962

The Kakisa Formation is a stratigraphic unit of Frasnian age in the Western Canadian Sedimentary Basin.

It takes the name from the Kakisa River, a tributary of the Mackenzie River, and was first described in outcrop on the banks of the Trout River by H.R. Belyea and D.J. McLaren in 1962.

== Lithology ==
The Kakisa Formation is composed of silty and dolomitic limestone. Reef builders such as corals and stromatoporoids can be identified in the formation. It is reefoid in its northern extent, where its thickness is variable.

== Distribution ==
The Kakisa Formation reaches a maximum thickness of 57 metres (190 ft). it occurs at the surface in outcrops along the Kakisa River between Tathlina Lake and Kakisa Lake and as an escarpment along the Mackenzie River. In the sub-surface, it can be found in north-eastern British Columbia, where it is typically 30 metres (100 ft) thick, and thins out towards the Peace River Arch.

== Relationship to other units ==
The Kakisa Formation is disconformably overlain by the Trout River Formation and conformably overlays the Redknife Formation (east) or the Fort Simpson Formation (west).

It is equivalent to parts of the Winterburn Group in central Alberta. Towards the west, it becomes shaley and turns into the Fort Simpson Formation.
