= Three Forks Group =

- Stratigraphic range: Famennian to Tournaisian
- Type: Geologic group
- Sub-units: Bakken Formation, Lyleton Formation, Big Valley Formation, Torquay Formation
- Underlies: Madison Group
- Overlies: Saskatchewan Group
- Thickness: 35 metres (110 ft) to 80 metres (260 ft)

Lithology
- Primary: Dolomite, mudstone, shale

Location
- Region: Western Canadian Sedimentary Basin, Williston Basin
- Country: Canada, United States

Type section
- Named for: Three Forks, Montana
- Named by: A.C. Peale, 1893

The Three Forks Group is a stratigraphic unit of Famennian age in the Williston Basin.

It takes the name from the city of Three Forks, Montana, and was first described in outcrop near the city by A.C. Peale in 1893 (for the Three Forks Shale).

== Lithology ==
The Three Forks Group is composed of dolomite, mudstone and bituminous shale.

=== Hydrocarbon production ===
In the subsurface of the Williston Basin, the Three Forks is referred to as the Three Forks Formation, which lies between the Birdbear Formation below, and the Bakken Formation above.

Oil produced from the Three Forks Formation in the Williston Basin of North Dakota and south-eastern Saskatchewan is often included in production statistics with the overlying Bakken Formation. For instance, the Three Forks and Bakken were combined in estimates of potential production released by the United States Geological Survey on April 30, 2013. The estimate by the USGS projects that 7.4 billion barrels of oil can be recovered from the Bakken and Three Forks formations and 6.7 trillion cubic feet of natural gas and 530 million barrels of natural gas liquids using current technology.

== Distribution ==
The Three Forks Group reaches a maximum thickness of 80 metres (260 ft), but can be as thin as 35 metres (110 ft).

== Subdivisions ==
Sub-unit	Age	Lithology	Max. thickness	Reference
Bakken Formation	Kinderhookian	bituminous shale	40 m (130 ft)	
Lyleton Formation	Famennian	red dolomitic and silty shale, argillaceous dolomite	40 m (130 ft)	
Big Valley Formation	Famennian	mudstone	40 m (130 ft)	
Torquay Formation	Famennian	brown dolomite, shale	65 m (210 ft)	

== Relationship to other units ==
The Three Forks Group conformably overlies the Saskatchewan Group and is disconformably overlain by the Madison Group.

It is equivalent to the sum of the Wabamun Group and Exshaw Formation in Alberta.
