= Palliser Formation =

Geologic formation in Canada

- Stratigraphic range: Famennian
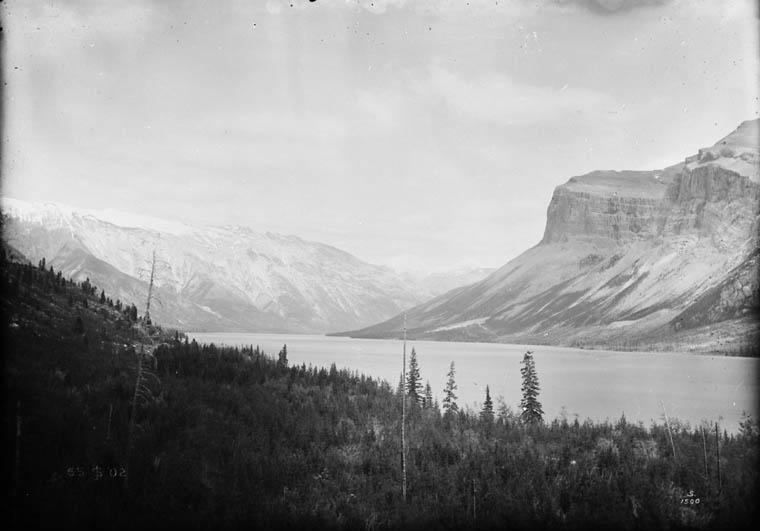
- The type section of the cliff-forming Palliser Formation near Lake Minnewanka
- Type: Geological formation
- Sub-units: Costigan Member; Morro Member
- Underlies: Exshaw Formation
- Overlies: Alexo Formation
- Thickness: up to 580 metres (1,900 ft)

Lithology
- Primary: Limestone, dolomite
- Other: Anhydrite

Location
- Coordinates: 51°15′09″N 115°17′51″W
- Region: Canadian Rockies
- Country: Canada

Type section
- Named for: Palliser Range
- Named by: H.H. Beach, 1943

The Palliser Formation is a stratigraphic unit of Late Devonian (Famennian) age in the Western Canada Sedimentary Basin. It is a thick sequence of limestone and dolomitic limestone that is present in the Canadian Rockies and foothills of western Alberta. Tall cliffs formed of the Palliser Formation can be seen throughout Banff and Jasper National Parks.

The formation was named for the Palliser Range in Banff National Park (which in turn took its name from John Palliser, the leader of the 1850s Palliser Expedition), by H.H. Beach in 1943. The type locality was defined in 1994 in the "Devil's Gap" section south of Mount Costigan of the Palliser Range, north of Lake Minnewanka.

== Lithology and paleontology ==
The Palliser Formation was deposited in a marine environment as an extensive carbonate shelf. It is subdivided into the Morro Member (the lower part) and the Costigan Member (the upper part). The Morro Member consists of massive, fine-grained limestone and dolomitic limestone. It contains remains of brachiopods, crinoids, gastropods, ostracods and conodont elements. The Costigan Member is less dolomitic, more argillaceous, and more fossiliferous than the Morro. It contains remains of brachiopods, crinoids, conodont elements, nautiloids, bryozoans, stromatoporoids and stromatolites. Anhydrite beds can be present in both members.

== Distribution and thickness ==
The Palliser Formation is present throughout the main and front ranges of the Canadian Rockies, where it reaches a maximum thickness of 580 metres (1,900 ft), as well as in the subsurface in the foothills, where it is up to 240 metres (790 ft) thick.

== Relationship to other units ==
The Palliser Formation is disconformably overlain by the Exshaw Formation and conformably underlain by the Alexo Formation. It is equivalent to the Wabamun Group in central Alberta, to the middle part of the Three Forks Formation in Saskatchewan and Montana and to the Tetcho Formation and Kotcho Formation in the Fort Nelson area of British Columbia.

== Economic resources ==
Limestone quarried from the Palliser Formation is used to manufacture cement at Exshaw, Alberta.
