= Redknife River =

Location
- Country: Canada
- Territory: Northwest Territories

Physical characteristics
- Source
  - location: Redknife Hills
  - coordinates: 60.56041°N 120.00383°W
  - elevation: 765 meters (2,510 ft)
- Mouth
  - location: Mackenzie River
  - coordinates: 61.22446°N 119.36891°W
  - elevation: 145 meters (476 ft)

Basin features
- River system: Mackenzie River

The Redknife River is a river in the Northwest Territories of Canada. It is a major tributary of the Mackenzie River.

The Redknife Formation, a stratigraphical unit of the Western Canadian Sedimentary Basin was named for the river.

== Course ==
The Redknife river originates in the Redknife Hills, at an elevation of 765 meters (2,510 ft). It flows east down the slopes of the hill, then turns north, draws water from a lake system, then turns north-east. It is crossed by the Mackenzie Highway, then turns north and flows into the Mackenzie River at an elevation of 145 meters (476 ft), 100 kilometers (62 mi) downstream from Fort Providence and 75 kilometers (47 mi) upstream from Jean Marie River.

== See also ==
- List of rivers of the Northwest Territories
