= Leduc Formation =

Geologic formation in Alberta, Canada

- Stratigraphic range: Frasnian; ~382–373 Ma
- Type: Geological formation
- Sub-units: Cooking Lake Member
- Underlies: Duvernay & Ireton Formations
- Overlies: Beaverhill Lake Formation
- Thickness: up to 300 m (980 ft)

Lithology
- Primary: Dolomite
- Other: Limestone

Location
- Coordinates: 53.3451°N 113.6949°W
- Approximate paleocoordinates: 12.4°S 41.2°W
- Region: Alberta
- Country: Canada
- Extent: Western Canadian Sedimentary Basin

Type section
- Named for: City of Leduc, Alberta
- Named by: Imperial Oil Limited
- Year defined: 1950
- Leduc Formation (Canada) Leduc Formation (Alberta)

The Leduc Formation is a stratigraphic unit of Late Devonian (Frasnian) age in the Western Canada Sedimentary Basin. It takes its name from the city of Leduc, and it was formally described from the B.A. Pyrz No. 1 well in central Alberta, between the depths of 1,623.7 m (5,327 ft) and 1,807.5 m (5,930 ft), by Imperial Oil Limited in 1950. Supplementary information came from a complete section of the formation that was cored in Imperial Oil's Leduc No. 530 well between 1,633 m (5,358 ft) and 1,863 m (6,112 ft).

The Leduc Formation is a major source of oil and gas in central Alberta, and the drilling of the highly successful Leduc No. 1 well in 1947 ushered in a new era in the Western Canadian petroleum industry.

== Lithology ==
The Leduc Formation consists of fossil reefs that are highly porous, which makes them excellent reservoirs for oil and gas. They were deposited as limestone and mudstone in shallow water reef environments. Stromatoporoids were the primary reef-building organisms, and rock-types range from skeletal mudstones and floatstones to finer grained muddy packstones and wackestones.

Many, but not all, of the reefs were later subjected to dolomitization during diagenesis, which increased their porosity, and they now consist of dolomite rather than limestone. The dolomitization that took place in the region has increased the porosity primarily in the more deeply buried lagoonal back reef facies. The pre-existing porosity has also been preserved well due to the dolomitization. Porosity in the region is dominated by vuggy, moldic, intercrystalline, as well as fracture types of porosity. Generally, the mean porosity of the Leduc Formation is 5.2%, with the permeability of the rocks in the region being an even spread.

Anhydrite is also common in the Leduc Formation, along with the replacement dolomitization.

== Oil and gas production ==
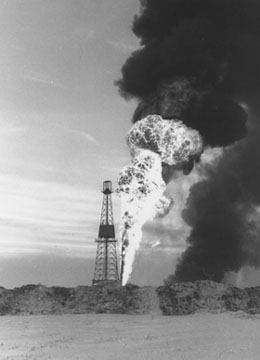
The Leduc No. 1 well

The Leduc Formation is a major source of oil and natural gas in central Alberta. The Leduc No. 1 well drilled in 1947 produced 50 thousand cubic metres (more than 300 thousand barrels) of oil, marking the beginning of the post-war Albertan oil boom, and contributed to a large population boom in the cities of Calgary and Edmonton. The discovery and subsequent production from the wells also led to an economic boom in Alberta, which now puts Calgary among the forefront of producers of oil in North America.

The Strachan and Ricinus West gas fields, discovered in 1967 and 1969, are also in Late Devonian Leduc-age reefs. The reefs were found using seismic common-depth point (CDP) techniques, which were being developed and used in the Western Canada Sedimentary Basin. The well that was crucial to the discovery of these two formations was drilled in 1955, and yielded gas as well as some salt water. Reef buildup of the Strachan and Ricinus gas field reefs are 900 feet (270 m) and 800 feet (240 m) respectively.

== Distribution and thickness ==
The Leduc Formation occurs as discrete, discontinuous reef "buildups" in a line following the Woodbend shelf margin from Drumheller in central Alberta to the Peace River Arch area in northern Alberta. The formation is absent in inter-reef areas, and buildups can reach from 180 meters (590 ft) to 300 meters (980 ft) in thickness.

== Relationship to other units ==
In central Alberta the Leduc Formation conformably overlies the platform limestones and dolomites of the Cooking Lake and Beaverhill Lake Formations. In northern Alberta near the Peace River Arch it rests on older red beds or on the Granite Wash. The Leduc reefs are surrounded by shales of the Duvernay and Ireton Formations and the Woodbend Group that were deposited in non-reefal, open marine environments.

The Leduc reefs are the same ages as, but not contiguous with, the reefs of the Cairn Formation farther west. Because the Leduc reefs are not exposed at the surface, the extensive outcrops of the Cairn reefs in the Canadian Rockies have been studied to increase the understanding of the Leduc reefs.

Near the Leduc Formation there is also the Swan Hills Formation. These two formations hold some similarities, such as the types of rocks and certain diagenetic processes. Rock types in both regions are dominated by limestones and dolomites. Dolomitization has taken place in both formations however it is more dominant in the Leduc Formation. Evaporites such as Anhydrites are also more present in the Leduc Formation, however they are also present in the Swan Hills Formation.

The Swan Hills Formation also holds some differences to the Leduc Formation. The porosity types in both formations differ, and the types of fossilized biota also differ. Vuggy, moldic, intercrystalline, and fracture porosities are present in the Leduc Formation whereas the primary porosities in the Swan Hills Formation are interparticle and interfossil. One of the primary fossilized biota in the Leduc Formation are stromatoporoids, whereas the primary fossil type in the Swan Hills Formation are Amphipora.

== Fossil content ==
The following fossils have been reported from the formation:

Bivalves

- Megalodon sp.
- Modiomorpha sp.
- Turbinopsis sp.

Brachiopods

- Conocardium sp.
- Cranaena sp.
- Schizophoria sp.

Gastropods

- Cypricardinia sp.
- Leptodesma (Leiopteria) sp.
- Archaeogastropoda indet.

Corals

- Actinostroma clathratum
- A. redwaterense
- Anostylostroma laxum
- Atelodictyon cf. stelliferum
- Euryamphipora platyformis
- Ferestromatopora dubia
- Hammatostroma nodosum
- Macgeea parva
- Peneckiella floydensis
- Stachyodes costulata
- Stromatopora cygnea
- Stromatoporella cf. subvesiculosa
- Stromatoporella damnoniensis
- Stromatoporella cf. mirabilis
- Synthetostroma vesiculosum
- Trupetostroma warreni
- Trupetostroma cf. coalescens
- Alveolites sp.
- Amphipora sp.
- Charactophyllum sp.
- Macgeea sp.
- Metriophyllum sp.
- Phacellophyllum sp.
- Phillipsastrea sp.
- Stachyodes sp.
- Syringoporella sp.
- Syringopora sp.
- Tabulophyllum sp.
- Thamnopora sp.
- Zaphrentis sp.
- ?Trupetostroma sp.
