= Wabamun Formation =

Geologic formation in Alberta, Canada

- Stratigraphic range: Famennian
- Type: Geological formation
- Sub-units: Crossfield Member
- Underlies: Exshaw Formation, Blairmore Group, Mannville Group
- Overlies: Graminia Formation (Winterburn Group)
- Thickness: up to 240 metres (790 ft)

Lithology
- Primary: Limestone, dolomite
- Other: Anhydrite

Location
- Coordinates: 53.3851°N 114.5123°W
- Region: Alberta
- Country: Canada

Type section
- Named for: Wabamun Lake
- Named by: Imperial Oil, 1950

The Wabamun Formation is a stratigraphic unit of Late Devonian (Famennian) age in the Western Canada Sedimentary Basin. It takes the name from Wabamun Lake and was first described in the Anglo Canadian Wabamun Lake No. 1 well (located between the Wabamun Lake and the North Saskatchewan River) by Imperial Oil in 1950.

== Lithology ==
The Wabamun Formation is composed of dolomitic limestone and calcareous dolomite with anhydrite interbeds. Halite and anhydrite are present at the base of the formation in the Stettler region. It is composed entirely of limestone in north-western Alberta. Secondary pyrite is found at the top of the formation.

== Hydrocarbon potential ==
The Wabamun Formation had an initial established recoverable oil reserve of 7.2 million m³, with 3.2 million m³ already produced as of 2008. Gas reserves totaled 102.8 million m³, with 53.5 million m³ already produced.

== Distribution ==
The Wabamun Formation reaches a maximum thickness of 240 metres (790 ft) in the sub-surface of central Alberta. It thins out and wedges towards the east, and thickens towards the Canadian Rockies foothills.

== Relationship to other units ==
The Wabamun Formation is disconformably overlain by the Exshaw Formation in southern Alberta, by the Blairmore Group in western Alberta and by the Mannville Group in eastern Alberta. It rests conformably on the Graminia Formation siltstone of the Winterburn Group.

In the Calgary area, the formation is divided into a lower and an upper part separated by the porous dolomitic Crossfield Member.

It is equivalent to the Three Forks Formation in Montana, the Palliser Formation in the Canadian Rockies, the sum of the Kotcho Formation and Tetcho Formation in northeastern British Columbia.
