= Pembina oil field =

Oil field in Alberta, Canada

- Location within Alberta
- Country: Canada
- Region: Central Alberta
- Offshore/onshore: onshore
- Coordinates: 53.1°N 115.2°W

Field history
- Discovery: 1953
- Start of production: 1953

Production
- Producing formations: Cardium Formation, Viking Formation, Rock Creek Member

The Pembina oil field is one of the largest and most prolific conventional oil fields in the province of Alberta, Canada.

The mature field is centered on Drayton Valley and is named for the Pembina River, which crosses the region from southwest to northeast. It taps reservoirs in the Cretaceous formations of the Western Canada Sedimentary Basin for oil and gas production. The main hydrocarbon-bearing unit is the Cardium Formation. Production also comes from the Viking Formation and sandstone beds of the Fernie Formation such as the Rock Creek Member.

== History ==
The first oil was discovered by Mobil Oil in February 1953, and it started a boom that saw an investment of $900 million in the area.

== Gallery ==
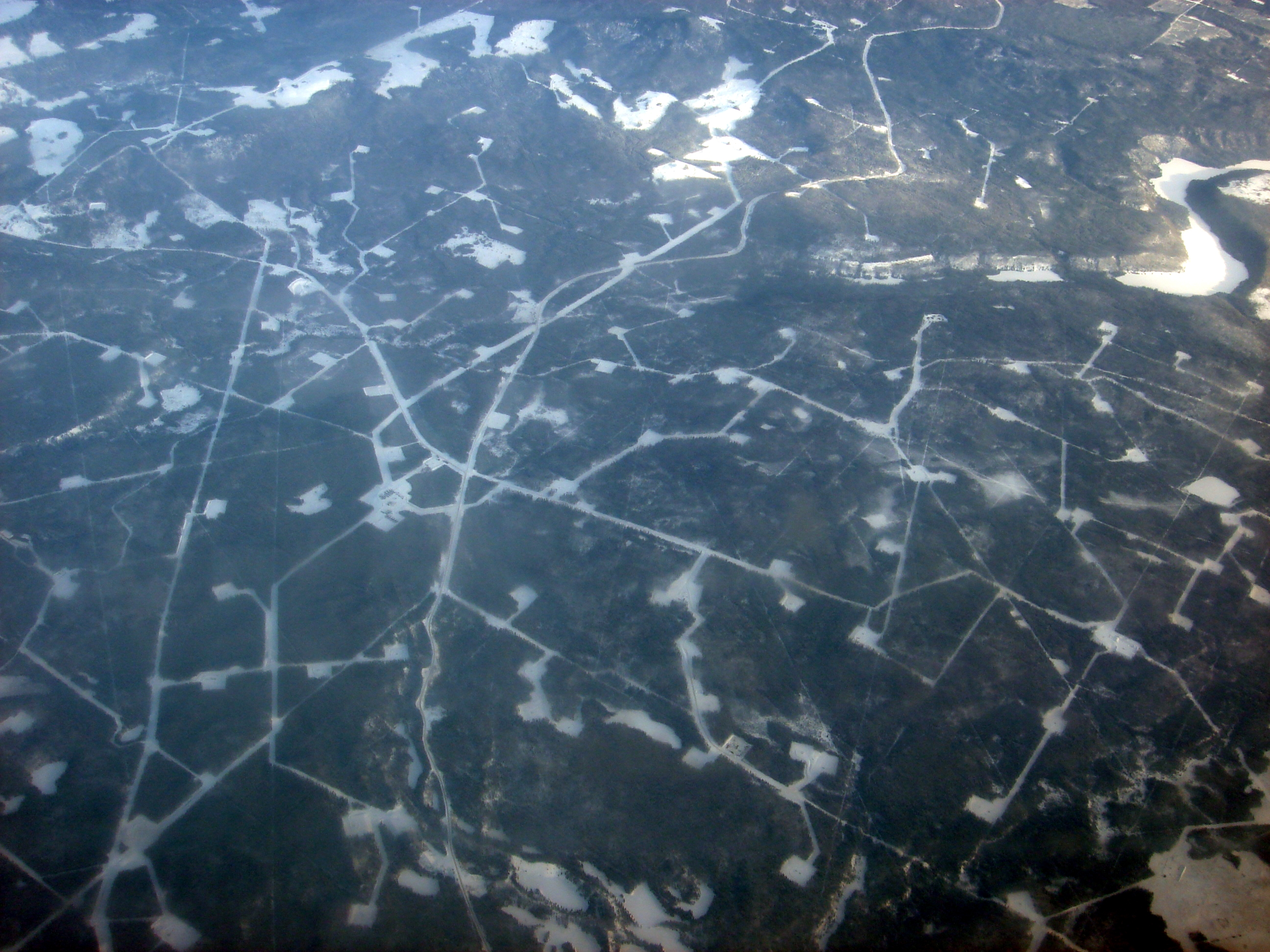
Aerial view of oil well locations in Pembina oil field

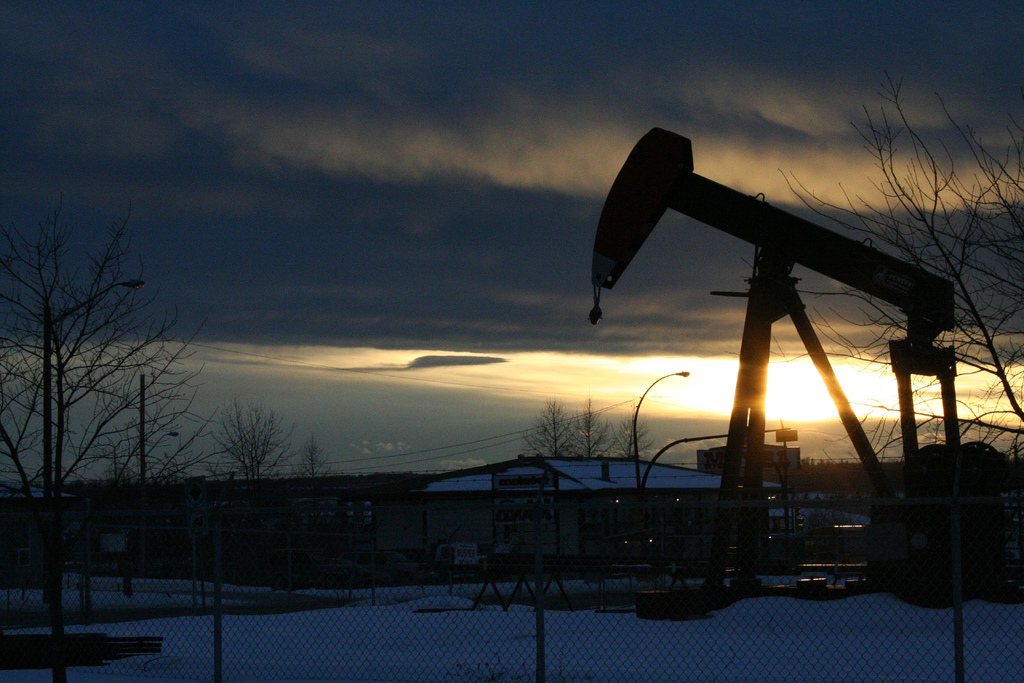
Pumpjack near Drayton Valley
