= Exshaw Formation =

Stratigraphic unit in the Western Canada Sedimentary Basin

- Stratigraphic range: Late Famennian to Middle Tournaisian
- Type: Geological formation
- Sub-units: Lower and Upper Exshaw
- Underlies: Banff Formation
- Overlies: Wabamun Formation, Kotcho Formation, Palliser Formation
- Thickness: up to 50 metres (160 ft)

Lithology
- Primary: Shale
- Other: Siltstone, limestone

Location
- Coordinates: 51°05′29″N 115°09′29″W
- Region: Alberta
- Country: Canada

Type section
- Named for: Exshaw, Alberta
- Named by: P.S. Warren, 1937

The Exshaw Formation is a stratigraphic unit in the Western Canada Sedimentary Basin. It takes the name from the hamlet of Exshaw, Alberta, in the Canadian Rockies, and was first described from outcrops on the banks of Jura Creek north of Exshaw by P.S. Warren in 1937. The formation is of Late Devonian (late Famennian) to Early Mississippian (middle Tournaisian) age as determined by conodont biostratigraphy, and it straddles the Devonian–Carboniferous boundary.

The Exshaw strata were deposited in a marine setting during the Hangenberg event, an oceanic anoxic event associated with the Late Devonian extinction. The black shales of the Exshaw Formation are rich in organic matter, and are one of the most important petroleum source rocks of the Western Canada Sedimentary Basin.

== Lithology and environment of deposition ==
The Exshaw Formation is informally subdivided into a lower shale member and an upper siltstone and limestone member. The lower shales are dark grey to black, thin-bedded to laminated, and rich in organic matter, with scattered sulphide and phosphate nodules. There is no evidence of disturbance by biological activity. They are believed to have been deposited in an offshore environment on the outer continental shelf under anoxic conditions. The shales are sparsely fossiliferous and contain some conodont elements, ostracods and brachiopod shells.

The upper member consists of brown-weathering, medium- to thick-bedded, calcareous and dolomitic siltstones with subordinate silty limestones. Bioturbation by burrowing marine organisms is common and indicates that they were deposited in an oxygenated environment, closer to the paleocoastline than the lower black shales were.

== Thickness and distribution ==
The Exshaw Formation has a thickness of 46.7 metres (150 ft) at its type locality near Exshaw and typically ranges between 7 metres (20 ft) and 50 metres (160 ft) thick. It is a widespread unit that can be seen in outcrop at many locations in the Canadian Rockies, and it is present in the subsurface from the prairies of northern Montana to southern Northwest Territories. It is absent at the Peace River Arch, and the upper siltstone member is absent in central Alberta and northern Alberta.

== Relationship to other units ==
Because the Exshaw Formation is a widespread unit, it overlies different formations in different areas. It rests disconformably on the Wabamun Formation in the Alberta plains, the Kotcho Formation in northeastern British Columbia, and the Palliser Formation in the Canadian Rockies and foothills. It is disconformably overlain by the Banff Formation in most areas.

The Exshaw Formation is equivalent to the lower and middle members of the Bakken Formation in southern Alberta, southern Saskatchewan, Montana and North Dakota.
