= Muskwa Formation =

Gas producing formation in Canada

- Stratigraphic range: Frasnian
- Type: Geological formation
- Unit of: Horn River Formation
- Underlies: Fort Simpson Formation
- Overlies: Otter Park Member
- Thickness: up to 34 metres (110 ft)

Lithology
- Primary: Shale

Location
- Coordinates: 58.7438°N 122.6781°W
- Region: British Columbia
- Country: Canada

Type section
- Named for: Muskwa River
- Named by: Gray & Kassube
- Year defined: 1963
- Muskwa Formation (Canada)

The Muskwa Formation is a stratigraphic unit of Frasnian age in the Western Canadian Sedimentary Basin.

It takes the name from Muskwa River, and was first described in the Western National Gas Fort Nelson a-95-J/94-J-10 well by F.F. Gray and J.R. Kassube, in 1963.

== Lithology ==
The Muskwa Formation is composed of bituminous shale. Pyrite is a common accessory mineral.

=== Gas production ===
Gas is produced from the Muskwa Formation shales in the Horn River Basin in the Greater Sierra oil field in north-eastern British Columbia. Horizontal drilling and fracturing techniques are used to extract the gas from the low permeability shales (see Shale gas).

== Distribution ==
The Muskwa Formation occurs in northern Alberta, north-eastern British Columbia and in the southern part of the Northwest Territories, and typically has a thickness of 34 metres (110 ft).

== Relationship to other units ==
The Muskwa Formation is a sub-unit of the Horn River Formation; it is conformably overlain by the Fort Simpson Formation and conformably underlain by the Otter Park Member.

== See also ==
- Muskwa Ranges
