= Western Canada Sedimentary Basin =

Large sedimentary basin in Canada

Coordinates: 55°N 112°W

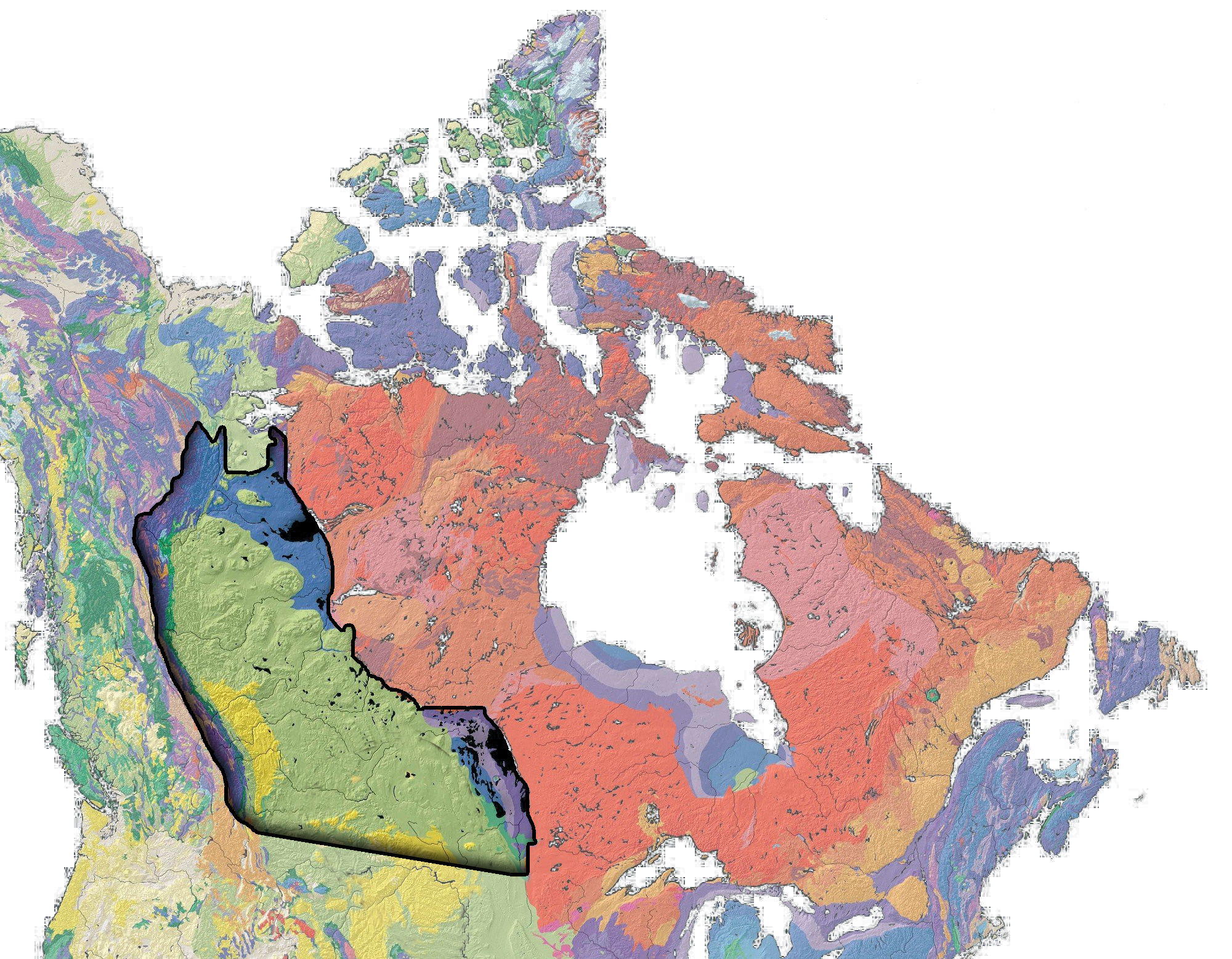
Outline of the Western Canada Sedimentary Basin

The Western Canada Sedimentary Basin (WCSB) underlies 1.4 million square kilometres (540,000 sq mi) of Western Canada including southwestern Manitoba, southern Saskatchewan, Alberta, northeastern British Columbia and the southwest corner of the Northwest Territories. This vast sedimentary basin consists of a massive wedge of sedimentary rock extending from the Rocky Mountains in the west to the Canadian Shield in the east. This wedge is about 6 kilometres (3.7 mi) thick under the Rocky Mountains, but thins to zero at its eastern margins. The WCSB contains one of the world's largest reserves of petroleum and natural gas and supplies much of the North American market, producing more than 450 million cubic metres (16 billion cubic feet) per day of gas in 2000. It also has huge reserves of coal. Of the provinces and territories within the WCSB, Alberta has most of the oil and gas reserves and almost all of the oil sands.

== Conventional oil ==
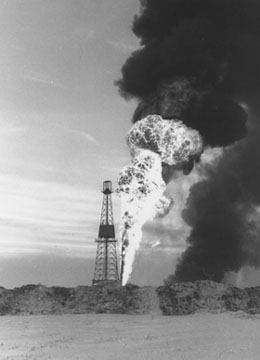
The Leduc No. 1 discovery sparked the oil boom in 1946

The WCSB is considered a mature area for exploration of petroleum and recent development has tended toward natural gas and oil sands rather than conventional oil. In the WCSB, conventional oil is of two different types: light crude oil and heavy crude oil, each with different costs, prices, and development strategies. Conventional light oil is a mature industry with most of the recoverable oil reserves already produced and production declining by three to four percent per year. Conventional heavy oil is also past its production peak with a future of long-term decline. Alberta, which contains most of the reserves, expects its light-medium crude oil production to decline by 42% from 2006 to 2016, while it expects heavy crude production to decrease by 35% over the same period. However, it also expects bitumen and synthetic crude oil from oil sands will considerably more than offset the decline in conventional crude oil and account for 87% of Alberta oil production by 2016.

For light oil, the petroleum industry is searching for the remaining undiscovered pools, drilling infill oil wells, or redeveloping existing pools using enhanced oil recovery (EOR) techniques such as waterfloods, miscible floods, and carbon dioxide injection. Currently, only about 27 percent of light oil is recovered, leaving large opportunities for improvement.

For conventional heavy oil, the industry is exploring new zones in undrilled portions of the basin to find remaining undiscovered pools, or to apply EOR schemes such as water floods, thermal projects, and miscible floods such as the Vapour Extraction Process (VAPEX) technology. Only 15 percent of heavy oil is currently being recovered, leaving a large volume for future recovery.

Improved seismic and drilling technology, higher recoveries from existing pools through infill drilling, and efficient, cost-effective exploration and development of smaller pools are maintaining levels of conventional oil production in the Western Canadian Sedimentary Basin. As the basin matures, the resource triangle with few large pools at the top, and many small pools at the base is being economically pursued deeper into the smaller pool segment as a result of these efficiencies.

== Oil sands ==
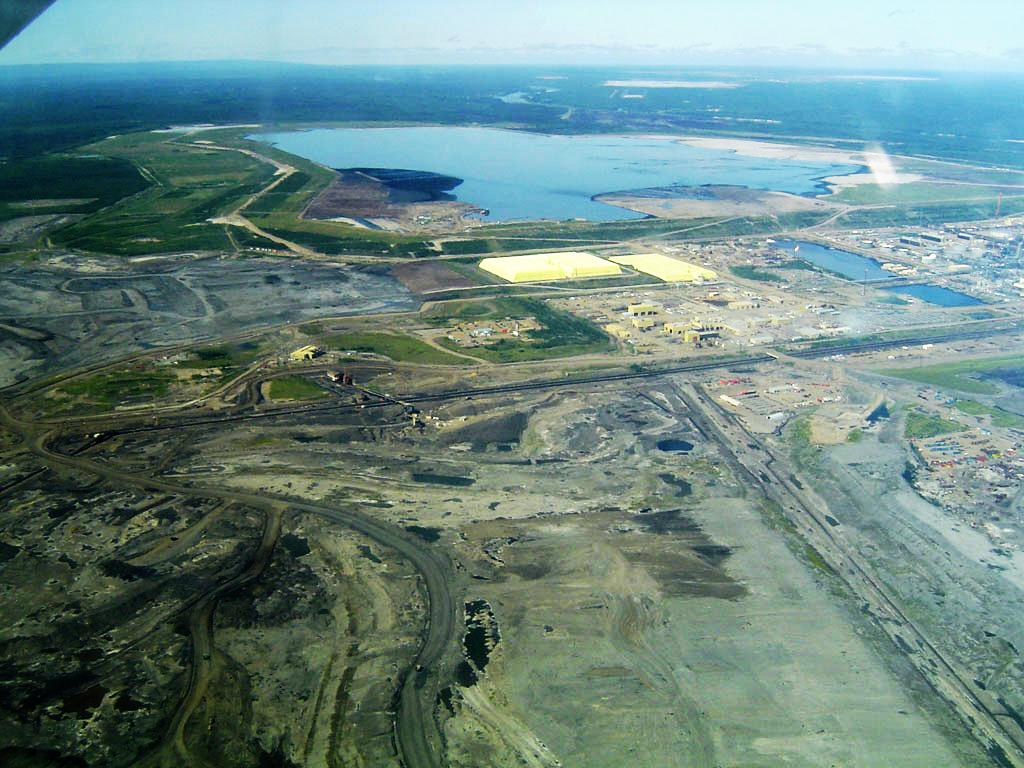
Mine at the Athabasca Oil Sands

According to the Alberta Energy and Utilities Board (EUB, now known as the Alberta Energy Regulator, the AER), Alberta's oil sands areas contain an ultimately recoverable crude bitumen resource of 50 billion cubic metres (315 billion barrels), with remaining established reserves of almost 28 billion cubic metres (174 billion barrels) at year-end 2004.

The Athabasca Oil Sands, the Cold Lake Oil Sands and the Peace River Oil Sands, which contain initial oil-in-place reserves of 260 billion cubic metres (1.6 trillion barrels), an amount comparable to the total world reserves of conventional oil. The World Energy Council reported (2007) that the three Alberta oil sands areas contain at least two-thirds of the world's discovered bitumen in place. These three major oil sands areas, all in Alberta, have reserves that dwarf those of the conventional oil fields. By 2007 the Alberta natural bitumen deposits were the source of over one third of the crude oil produced in Canada.

As a result of the oil price increases since 2003, the number of major mining, upgrading and thermal in-situ projects has grown to some 46 existing and proposed projects, encompassing 135 project expansion phases in various stages of execution. Estimates of capital expenditures to construct all announced projects over the period 2006 to 2015 total $125 billion. According to a Statistics Canada 2006 report, this extremely high level of activity has caused a severe labor shortage in Alberta and driven unemployment rates to their lowest level in history – the lowest of all 10 Canadian provinces and 50 U.S. states. This is the main factor limiting growth of oil sands production in the WCSB.

== Natural gas ==
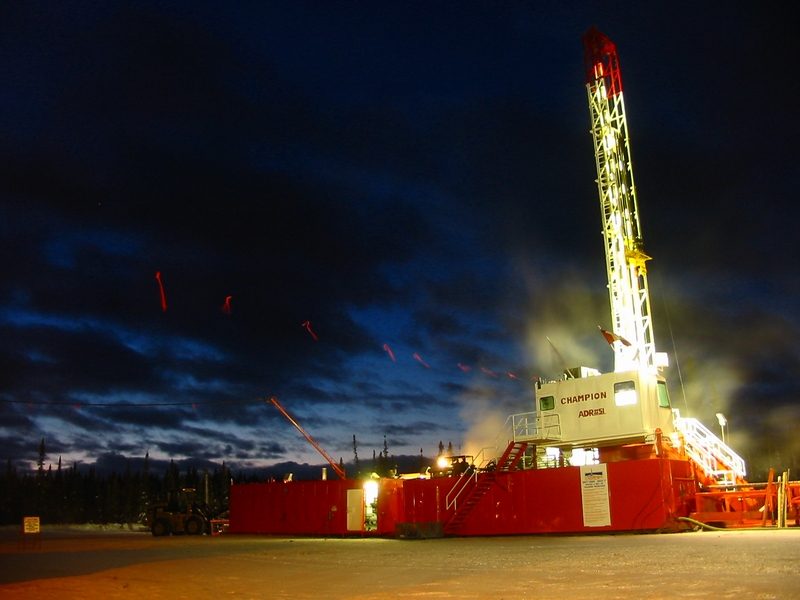
Drilling rig in the gas-bearing Greater Sierra field

Canada is the third largest producer and second largest exporter of gas in the world, with the vast majority of it coming from the WCSB. The WCSB is estimated to have 143 trillion cubic feet (4,000 km^{3}) of marketable gas remaining (discovered and undiscovered), which represents about two thirds of Canadian gas reserves. Over half of the gas produced is exported to the United States.

However, Canadian gas reserves represent less than one percent of world reserves and are rapidly becoming exhausted according to a 2010 paper. The majority of the large gas pools have been discovered and a significant portion of the discovered reserves has been produced. Production from the basin peaked in 2001 at around 16 billion cubic feet (450,000,000 m^{3}) per day and was predicted in 2003, by the National Energy Board to be likely to decline from that level. The overall decline rate increased from 13 percent per year in 1992 to 23 percent in 2002, which means 3.8 billion cubic feet per day (110,000,000 m^{3}/d) of production must be replaced each year just to keep production constant. With the basin being largely explored and operators finding less gas with each new well, this seems improbable. New gas reserves in the WCSB will likely come from unconventional sources such as coalbed methane (CBM).

The number of coalbed methane wells in Alberta more than doubled in 2005, to 7764 by the end of that year, producing nearly 0.5 billion cubic feet (14,000,000 m^{3}) of gas per day. More than 95 percent of the CBM wells were completed in the Upper Cretaceous Horseshoe Canyon and Belly River formations, at typical depths of 300 to 2,400 feet (91–732 m). About 4 percent of the CBM wells are completed in the Lower Cretaceous Mannville Formation, at depths of 2,300 to 4,300 feet (700–1,310 m).

Author David J. Hughes in his 2004 book entitled North America's Natural Gas Crisis, predicted that the Western Canadian Sedimentary Basin would likely continue to be the main gas supply area in Canada for many years; however, declining production and the likelihood that much of the gas will be diverted to fuel new oil sands plants mean that the probability of there being sufficient surplus gas to meet projected U.S. demand is low, and the US will have to look elsewhere for future gas supplies.

== Coal ==
The WCSB contains about 90 percent of Canada's usable coal resources. Their rank ranges from lignite to semianthracite. About 36 percent of the total estimated 71,000 megatonnes of usable coal is bituminous, including a high proportion of medium to low volatile coals. The low sulfur content and acceptable ash levels of these bituminous coals make them attractive as coking feedstocks, and large quantities are mined for that purpose. However, the lack of heavy industry in Western Canada means that only a limited amount of this coal is consumed in Canada, and most is exported to Japan, Korea and other countries. The lower rank coals are used mainly for electricity generation, where the existence of shallow coal seams with little overburden make strip-mining and reclamation easy, and low sulfur levels reduce the environmental impact of their use.

== See also ==
- History of the petroleum industry in Canada
- List of oil-producing states
- OPEC
