= Simla Formation =

Geologic formation in Canada

- Stratigraphic range: late Frasnian
- Type: Formation
- Underlies: Sassenach Formation or Palliser Formation
- Overlies: Mount Hawk Formation or Southesk Formation
- Thickness: Up to about 85 m (280 ft)

Lithology
- Primary: Limestone, dolomite
- Other: Siltstone

Location
- Coordinates: 53°16′48″N 118°39′18″W
- Region: Alberta and British Columbia
- Country: Canada

Type section
- Named for: Mount Simla
- Named by: D. J. McLaren and E. W. Mountjoy, 1962.

The Simla Formation is a stratigraphic unit of Late Devonian (late Frasnian) age. It is present on the western edge of the Western Canada Sedimentary Basin in the Rocky Mountains and foothills of west-central Alberta and east-central British Columbia. It consists primarily of carbonate rocks and siltstone, and was named for Mount Simla in northern Jasper National Park by D. J. McLaren and E. W. Mountjoy in 1962.

The Simla Formation is fossiliferous. It preserves remains of marine animals, and is especially known for its many species of rugose corals.

== Lithology and deposition ==
The Simla Formation consists of recessive argillaceous siltstones, overlain by thick-bedded, cliff-forming limestones and dolomitic limestones. It was deposited as a shallow subtidal, open-marine carbonate shelf.

== Thickness and distribution ==
The Simla Formation is present over a distance of about 280 km (175 mi) in the Rocky Mountains and foothills of west-central Alberta and east-central British Columbia, where it is consistently about 60 to 85 m (200 to 280 feet) thick.

== Relationship to other units ==
Originally considered to be the lower part of the Alexo Formation or a member of the Southesk Formation, the Simla was raised to the rank of formation by H. H. J. Geldsetzer in 1982. It conformably overlies the Mount Hawk Formation or the Southesk Formation, and is conformably overlain by the Sassenach Formation or the Palliser Formation, depending on the location.

== Paleontology ==
The Simla Formation is known for its rugose coral fauna, which comprises more than 30 species. It was the product of an evolutionary burst that began in middle Frasnian time and was ended by the Frasnian–Famennian extinction event. The formation also includes tabulate corals, brachiopods, stromatoporoids, crinoids, conodonts, and foraminifera.

== See also ==
- List of fossiliferous stratigraphic units in Alberta
