= Fairholme Group =

Rock layer in Western Canadian

- Stratigraphic range: Frasnian
- Type: Group
- Sub-units: Mount Hawk Formation; Southesk Formation; Perdrix Formation; Cairn Formation; Maligne Formation; Flume Formation; Borsato Formation; Hollebeke Formation
- Underlies: Sassenach Formation, Alexo Formation, Crowfoot Formation, or Palliser Formation
- Overlies: Beaverhill Lake Group, Yahatinda Formation, or pre-Devonian Formations
- Thickness: Up to about 730 m (2400 feet)

Lithology
- Primary: Limestone, dolomite
- Other: Mudstone, siltstone

Location
- Coordinates: 51°05′00″N 115°07′00″W
- Region: Alberta, British Columbia
- Country: Canada

Type section
- Named for: Fairholme Range
- Named by: H.H. Beach
- Year defined: 1943

The Fairholme Group is a stratigraphic unit of Late Devonian (Frasnian) age. It is present on the western edge of the Western Canada Sedimentary Basin in the Rocky Mountains and foothills of Alberta and British Columbia. It was named for the Fairholme Range near Exshaw in the Canadian Rockies by H.H. Beach in 1943.

The formations of the Fairholme Group include fossils of marine animals such as stromatoporoids, corals, brachiopods, crinoids, and conodonts.

== Lithology ==
The Fairholme Group was deposited in marine environments and can be subdivided into three gross lithologic units:

- The basal carbonate platform sequence of the Flume Formation, or in southern areas the Hollebeke and Borsato Formations, which are composed of limestones and dolomites.
- The carbonate buildups (reefal sequences) of the Cairn and Southesk Formations, also composed of limestones and dolomites.
- The basin-fill clastic rocks of the Maligne, Perdrix, and Mount Hawk Formations, which consist primarily of mudstones, argillaceous limestones, and calcareous shales. These are laterally equivalent to the reefal units.

== Distribution and thickness ==
The Fairholme Group is present in the Canadian Rockies from the Kakwa Lakes area of northeastern British Columbia, south through Alberta to the Flathead River region of southeastern British Columbia, as well as in the subsurface beneath the immediately adjacent plains to the east. Where fully developed, the group reaches thicknesses from about 300 to 728 m (980 to 2400 feet).

== Relationship to other units ==
The Fairholm Group overlies the Beaverhill Lake Group in the southern Alberta plains, and unconformably overlies the Middle Devonian Yahatinda Formation or pre-Devonian formations in the mountains. It is overlain by the Crowfoot Formation in the plains, and the Sassenach, Alexo or, rarely, the Palliser Formation in the mountains. It is equivalent to the Woodbend Group and the lower part of the Winterburn Group of the plains.

== See also ==
- List of fossiliferous stratigraphic units in Alberta
