= Maligne Formation =

Geologic formation in Canada

- Stratigraphic range: Frasnian
- Type: Formation
- Unit of: Fairholme Group
- Underlies: Perdrix Formation
- Overlies: Flume Formation
- Thickness: Up to about 30 m (98 feet)

Lithology
- Primary: Argillaceous limestone
- Other: Calcareous mudstone, shale

Location
- Coordinates: 53°03′00″N 118°05′00″W
- Region: Alberta; British Columbia
- Country: Canada

Type section
- Named for: Maligne River
- Named by: P.W. Taylor, 1957.

The Maligne Formation is a stratigraphic unit of Late Devonian (Frasnian) age. It is present on the western edge of the Western Canada Sedimentary Basin in the Rocky Mountains and foothills of Alberta and British Columbia. It consists primarily of argillaceous limestone and calcareous mudstone, and was named for the Maligne River in Jasper National Park by P.W. Taylor in 1957.

The formation is fossiliferous and includes remains of brachiopods, crinoids, gastropods, cephalopods, and other marine animals, as well as traces made by burrowing organisms.

== Lithology and thickness ==
The Maligne Formation was deposited in a marine environment. It consists of thin-bedded dark grey to black argillaceous limestone and calcareous mudstone. In some areas it includes thin interbeds of shale. It is generally 12 to 30 m (39 to 98 ft) thick.

== Distribution and relationship to other units ==
The Maligne Formation is present in Canadian Rocky Mountains and foothills between the Kakwa Lakes area of northeastern British Columbia and the Cline River area of west-central Alberta, a distance of about 300 km (186 mi). It overlies the Flume Formation and is overlain by the Perdrix Formation. It grades laterally into the carbonate rocks of the upper Cairn Formation.
