= Borsato Formation =

Stratigraphic unit of Late Devonian age

- Stratigraphic range: Frasnian; ~382–373 Ma
- Type: Formation
- Unit of: Fairholme Group
- Underlies: Mount Hawk Formation or Southesk Formation
- Overlies: Hollebeke Formation
- Thickness: Up to about 60 m (200 ft)

Lithology
- Primary: Dolomite

Location
- Coordinates: 49°23′50″N 114°34′53″W
- Region: British Columbia; Alberta
- Country: Canada

Type section
- Named for: Mount Borsato
- Named by: R.A. Price
- Year defined: 1965
- Borsato Formation (Canada) Borsato Formation (Alberta)

The Borsato Formation is a stratigraphic unit of Late Devonian (Frasnian) age. It is present on the western edge of the Western Canada Sedimentary Basin in the southern Rocky Mountains of Alberta and British Columbia. It consists of dolomite and was named for Mount Borsato in the Flathead Range near North Kootenay Pass by R.A. Price in 1965.

The formation is fossiliferous and includes remains of stromatoporoids and tabulate corals.

== Thickness and lithology ==
The Borsato Formation is 20 to 60 metres (66 to 197 ft) thick. It was deposited in a reefal environment and consists of dark coloured, medium- to thick-bedded, medium- to coarse-crystalline dolomite.

== Distribution and relationship to other units ==
The Borsato Formation is present in the Rocky Mountains of southeastern British Columbia and southwestern Alberta, west of the Lewis Thrust Fault and south of about 49° 45". It overlies the Hollebeke Formation, and is overlain by the Mount Hawk Formation or the Peechee Member of the Southesk Formation, depending on the location.
