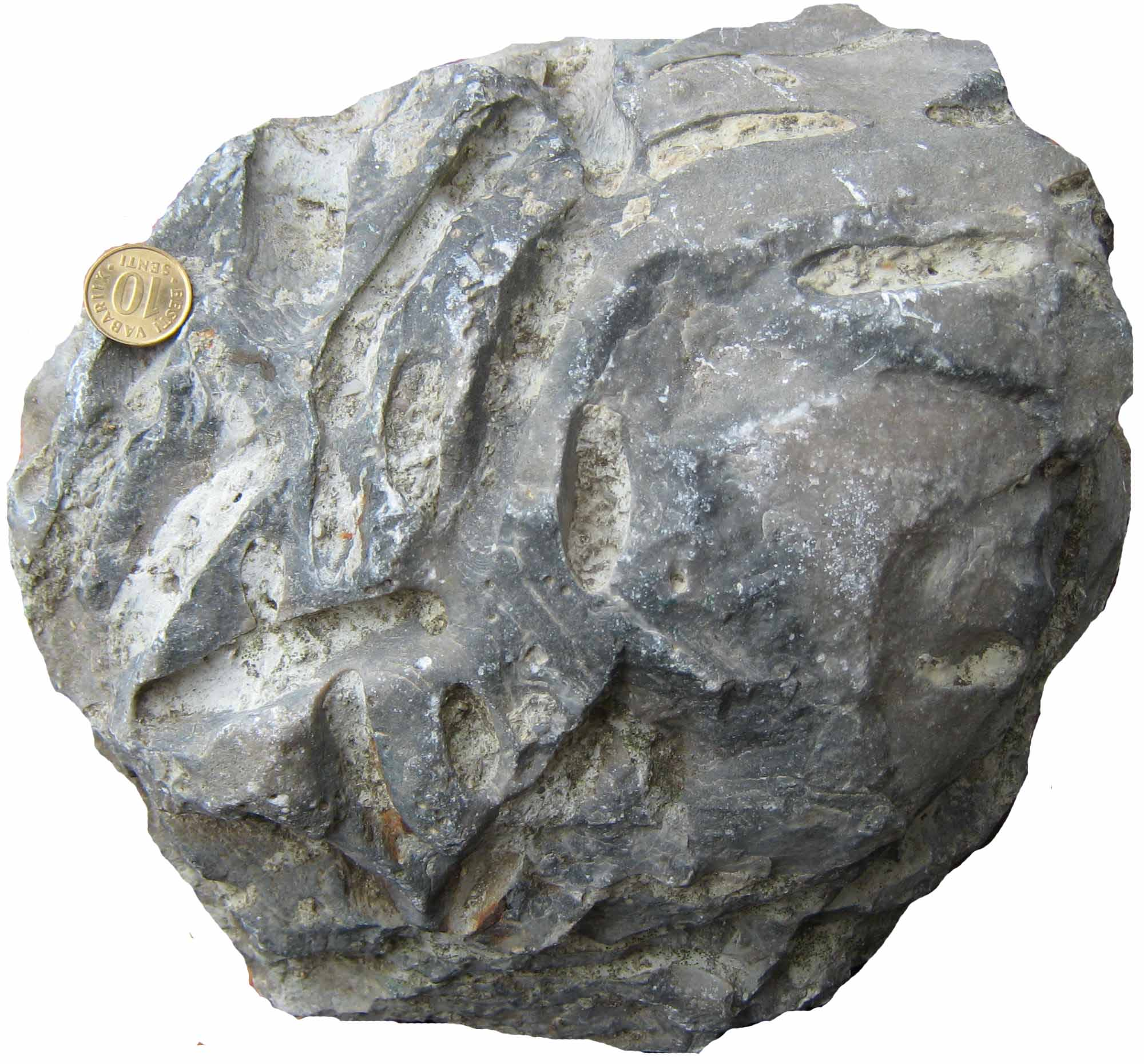
- Osprioneides kampto borings in a Sheinwoodian stromatoporoid from Saaremaa, Estonia.

Trace fossil classification
- Ichnogenus: †Osprioneides; Beuck and Wisshak, 2008

= Osprioneides =

Osprioneides Temporal range: Silurian

Trace fossil

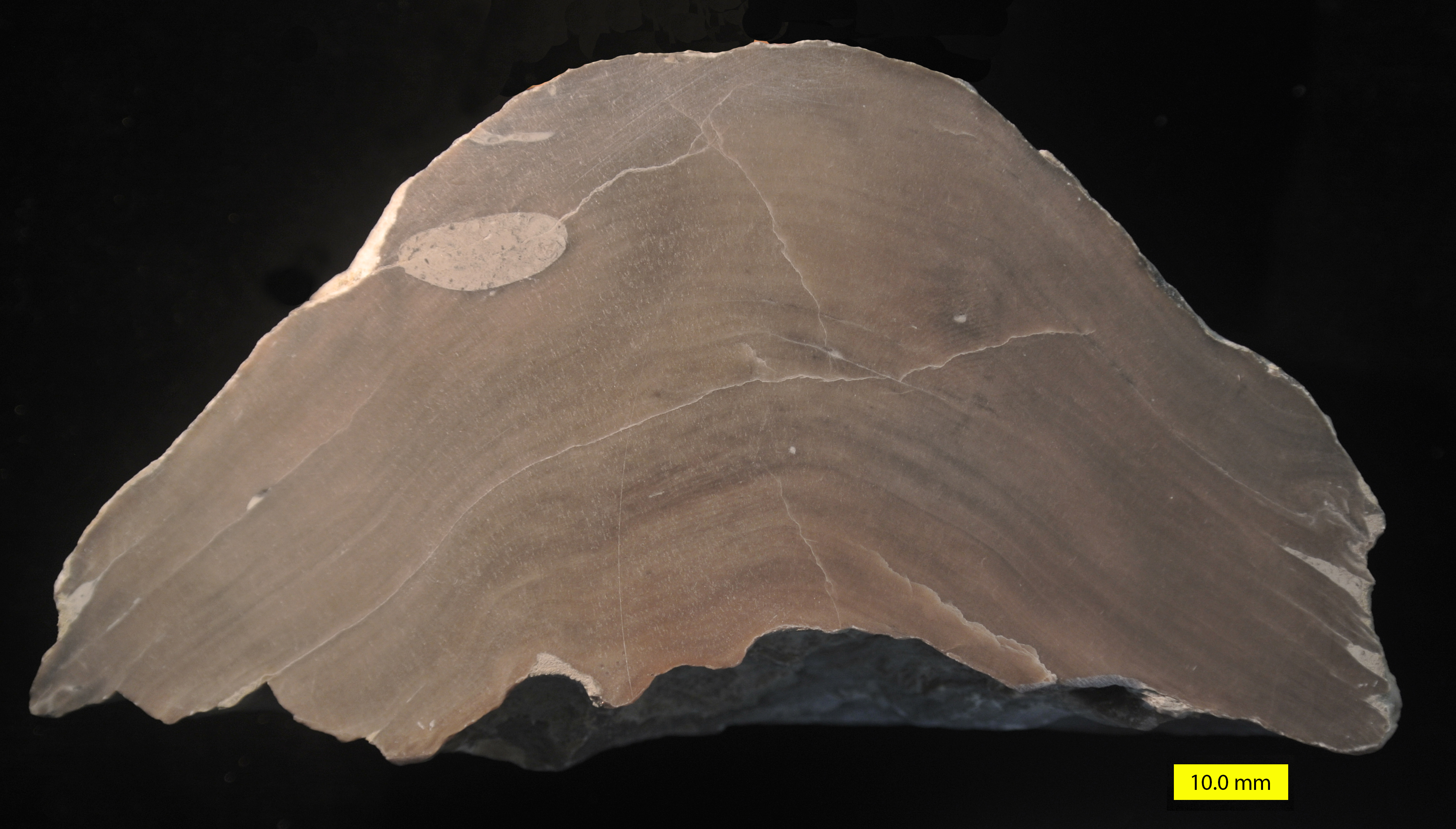
Cross-section of Osprioneides (upper left) in the stromatoporoid Densastroma pexisum from the Silurian of Saaremaa Island, Estonia.

Osprioneides is an ichnogenus of unbranched, elongate borings (a type of trace fossil) in lithic substrate with oval cross−section, single−entrance and straight, curved or irregular course. Osprioneides kampto Beuck and Wisshak, 2008 is the largest known Palaeozoic boring trace. It occurs in the Ordovician and Silurian (Wenlock) of Baltica. The borings are up to 120 mm long measuring 5–17 mm in diameter. The distribution of Osprioneides is more environmentally limited than that of Trypanites in the Silurian of Saaremaa, Estonia (Baltica). Osprioneides probably occurred only in large hard substrates of relatively deepwater muddy bottom open shelf environments. Osprioneides were relatively rare, as compared to Trypanites-Palaeosabella borings in the Wenlock of Saaremaa.
