= Perdrix Formation =

Geologic formation

- Stratigraphic range: Frasnian
- Type: Formation
- Unit of: Fairholme Group
- Underlies: Mount Hawk Formation
- Overlies: Maligne Formation, or Flume Formation
- Thickness: Up to 140 metres (460 ft)

Lithology
- Primary: Shale
- Other: Limestone

Location
- Region: Alberta
- Country: Canada

Type section
- Named for: Roche à Perdrix
- Named by: P.E. Raymond, 1930

The Perdrix Formation is a geologic formation of Late Devonian (Frasnian) age in the Western Canada Sedimentary Basin. It named for Roche à Perdrix in Jasper National Park, Alberta, by P.E. Raymond in 1930. It includes fossils of marine animals.

== Lithology ==
The Perdrix Formation was deposited in a marine basin and consists primarily of black, bituminous shales. The upper portion includes nodules and thin nodular beds of argillaceous limestone that increase in frequency upwards and laterally toward the reefs of the Cairn Formation.

== Thickness and distribution ==
The Perdrix Formation is present as outcrops in the front and main ranges of the Canadian Rockies from the Kakwa Lakes area in northeastern British Columbia to the Ram River area of Alberta. It is also recognized in the subsurface immediately adjacent to the mountain front. Thicknesses range from about 80 metres (260 ft) to 140 metres (460 ft).

== Relationship to other units ==
The Perdrix Formation overlies the Maligne Formation or, where the Maligne is absent, the Flume Formation. It is conformably overlain by the Mount Hawk Formation and the contact is gradational. Laterally it interfingers with the Peechee Formation and the reefs of the Cairn Formation.

== Paleontology ==
Tentaculids are common throughout the Perdrix Formation, and brachiopods and pelecypods are present in the more limestone-rich portions.

== See also ==
- List of fossiliferous stratigraphic units in Alberta
