= Yahatinda Formation =

Geologic formation in Western Canada

- Stratigraphic range: Givetian; ~387–383 Ma
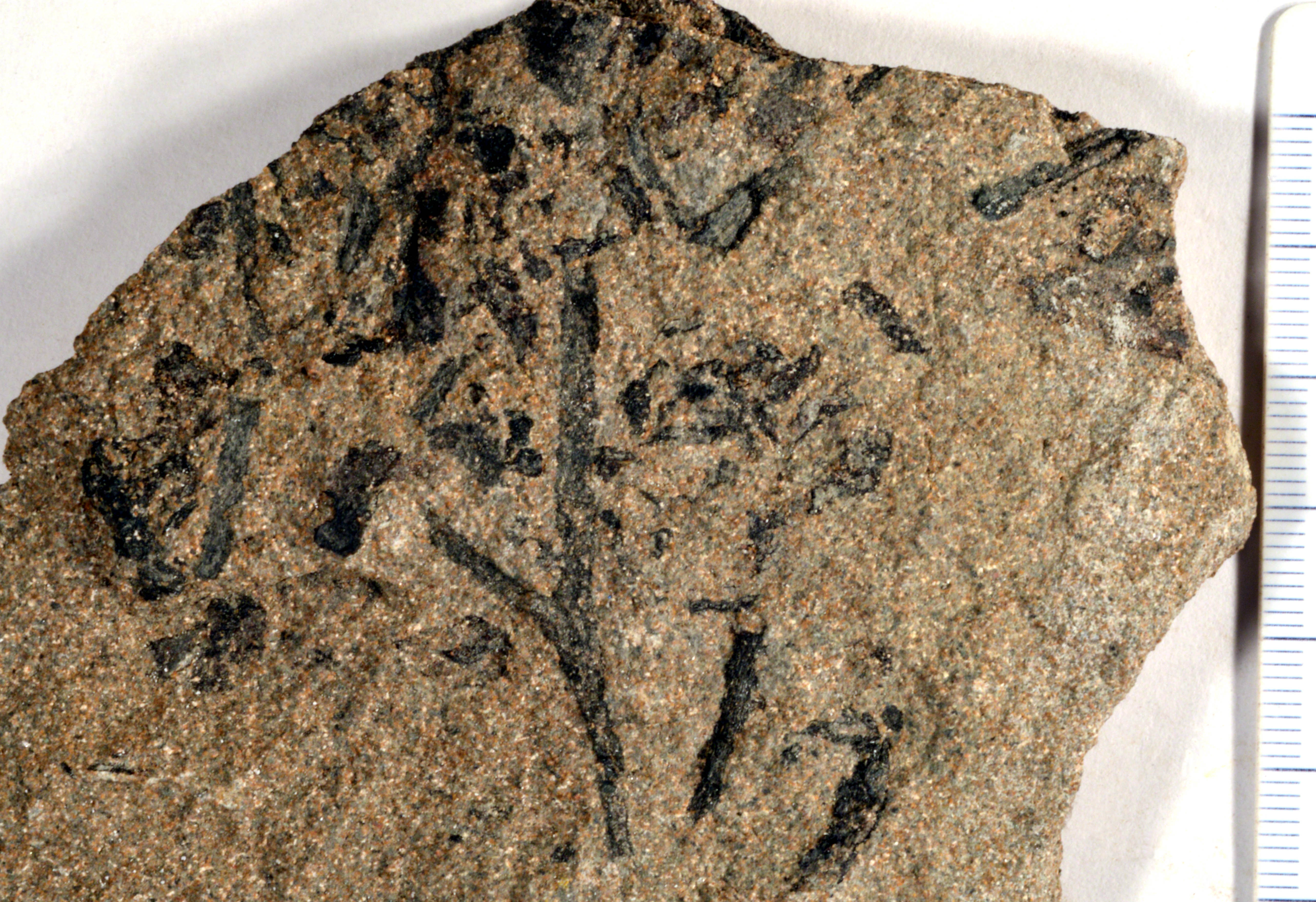
- Fossil plant (a trimerophyte) from the Yahatinda Formation
- Type: Formation
- Underlies: Flume Formation,Cairn Formation
- Overlies: Eldon Formation
- Thickness: Typically less than 30 m (98 ft)

Lithology
- Primary: Dolomitic sandstone,Dolomite, siltstone and mudstone
- Other: Conglomerate and breccia

Location
- Coordinates: 51°44′00″N 115°43′30″W
- Region: Alberta
- Country: Canada

Type section
- Named for: Ya-Ha-Tinda Ranch, Alberta
- Named by: J.D. Aitken
- Year defined: 1966
- Yahatinda Formation (Canada)

The Yahatinda Formation is a geologic formation from Alberta containing fossils dated to the Devonian, specifically the late Givetian. The formation is largely made up of dolostones and dolomite though there are breccias and conglomerates located towards the based on the formation. It overlies the Cairn Formation and Flume Formation while underlying the Eldon Formation. Not many fossils have been found within the Yahatinda Formation though placoderms, lobe-finned fish, and jawless fish have been found. Two distinct environments are preserved within the formation being a river and coastal marine environments. The strata that suggest a river or delta environment are generally found in older layers of the formation than the marine beds.

== History and naming ==
What is now known as the Yahatinda Formation was originally defined as the Ghost River Formation by Walcott in 1921. This original locality was made up of dolomites that lay above Cambrian- aged limestones located below the late Devonian Fairholme Group. However, due to the formation being poorly described by the original author, a number of ages were applied to it with these dates ranging between the Cambrian and Devonian. These previous issues with the age of the formation were remedied when Aitken (1966) published a more detailed description of the locality along with assigning the a large amount of the formation to the Cambrian with only the top 5 feet (1.5 m) being considered early Devonian. During this field work, separate plant-bearing beds were found nearby which would later be referred to as the Yahatinda Formation.

The Yahatinda Formation is named after the Ya-Ha-Tinda Ranch which is located at the northern side of the Red Deer River. Both of these are located near the eastern border of the Banff National Park.

== Description ==
The beds that make up the Yahatinda Formation, located on the west side of the Wapiti Mountain, have a thickness of 36 metres (118 ft) and a width of 275–365 metres (902–1,198 ft). In areas outside of the type locality, the formation can reach a thickness of 265 m (869 ft). The beds themselves are made up of two distinct facies being the channel and non-channel facies. The channel facies are made up of dolosiltite and pink to purple-red dolomite though breccias and conglomerate are also common. The facies are located in the deeper areas of the sub-Devonian channels. Fossil fragments of both fossil plants and animals have been found within the dolomite with this fauna being either brackish to freshwater. Due to the alternation of texture in the grains and the presence of scour-and-fill structures, it is most likely that the channel facies represent a river ecosystem. The presence of mudcracks along with the fact that deposition only took place in the lower parts of the channels and valleys also suggest this river delta interpretation. The non-channel facies are represented by thinner sections that are made up of siltstones, dolosiltites, and dolomites. Throughout the beds, a number of stromatolites with a maximum diameter of 30 centimetres (12 in) have been found. The breccias and conglomerates are present under these facies. These two different facies are at different levels of the formation though show a transition with this transition ranging from smooth to abrupt.

The age of the formation is based on the macroflora along with the spores found in the beds of the formation along with that dating of associated formations. The Yahatinda Formation is uncomfortably overlain by the Flume Formation which has been dated to between the latest Givetian and earliest Frasnian which gave previous authors an earliest age of before the latest Givetian. The Yahatinda Formation was later understood to represent the pertidal belt of the Gilwood member of the Watt Mountain Formation which suggests that the formation dates to between the middle to early late Givetian. The flora confirm this dating due to the presence of Aneurospora greggsi, a spore common during the late Givetian and earliest Frasnian. The Yahatinda Formation is also overlain by the Cairn Formation, another late Devonian formation that is part of the Fairholme Group. The contact between the two formations is covered with rubble.

The Yahatinda Formation uncomfortably overlays the Eldon Formation, a middle Cambrian formation that gets truncated by the overlying formation. This unconformity is noticeable due to the sudden transition between the thickly bedded limestones of the Eldon Formation and the very thinly bedded dolostone of the Yahatinda Formation. It was deposited along the east side of the Western Alberta Ridge, a paleogeographic feature that existed at that time, and it is equivalent to the Cedared Formation that was deposited on the western side of the ridge. It is equivalent in age to the upper part of the Elk Point Group in the basin to the east.

== Paleobiota ==
=== Antiarchi ===
Antiarchs recorded from the Yahatinda Formation
| Genus | Species | Notes | Locality | Image |
|---|---|---|---|---|
| Antiarchi indet. | | An antiarch known from a number of incomplete plates that is most likely Asterolepis due to the morphology and correlation to other similarly dated formations in the area. | 2,3 | |

=== Arthrodira ===
Arthrodires recorded from the Yahatinda Formation
| Genus | Species | Notes | Locality | Image |
|---|---|---|---|---|
| Arthrodira indet. | | Indeterminate specimens from at three different species of arthrodires. Based on the material, two of these are from medium-sized members of the group while the third was very large. | 4 | |
| Holonema | H. sp | A holonematid known from a few isolated plates. Though different in morphology, the material from the formation is similar in size to H. haiti. | 4 | |

=== Pteraspidiformes ===
Pteraspidiformes recorded from the Yahatinda Formation
| Genus | Species | Notes | Locality | Image |
|---|---|---|---|---|
| Clavulaspis | C. finis | A large pteraspidid originally named "Helaspis " though was renamed due to the fact that the genus name was invalid. The genus was one of the last surviving pteraspidiforms with material from both adults and juveniles being found within the channel deposits of the formation. | 2,3 | |

=== Sarcopterygii ===
Sarcopterygians recorded from the Yahatinda Formation
| Genus | Species | Notes | Locality | Image |
|---|---|---|---|---|
| Porolepiformes indet. | | A porolepiform represented by plate fragments along with some scales found at the formation. The preserved material is similar to the morphology of Glyptolepis. | 5 | |
| Sarcopterygii indet. | | A single boney plate which is most likely a scale from a sarcopterygian. | 2 | |
| Tristichopteridae indet. | | A tristichopterid represented by a single incomplete lower jaw found at the formation. Due to the age, it has been suggested to most likely be close to Tristichopterus. | 5 | |

=== Palynomorphs ===
Palynomorphs recorded from the Yahatinda Formation
| Genus | Species | Notes | Locality | Image |
|---|---|---|---|---|
| Aneurospora | A. greggsii | | | |

=== Progymnospermopsida ===
Progymnosperms recorded from the Yahatinda Formation
| Genus | Species | Notes | Locality | Image |
|---|---|---|---|---|
| Archaeopteris | A. macilesta | | | |
| Archaeopteris | A. sp | | | |

== Paleoenvironment ==
The paleoenvironment of the non-channel beds of the formation transition between multiple distinct environments throughout the strata. The basal-most layers of the formation have been interpreted to be shallow marine subtidal to intertidal low energy environment. Similar to these layers, the dolostone couplets also represent a low energy environment though these record a cycle between intertidal and supratidal environments. Throughout both of these strata, there is evidence of exposure to the air between preserved mudcracks and color molting. The breccia present in the lower areas is interpreted to be in deeper water that was never exposed to the open air. As the name suggests, the channel beds of the formation were either made by a river or delta.
