= Ghost River Formation =

Geologic formation in Alberta, Canada

- Stratigraphic range: Cambrian to Middle Devonian
- Type: Formation (abandoned)
- Thickness: 87 metres (290 ft)

Location
- Coordinates: 51°44′00″N 115°43′30″W
- Region: Alberta
- Country: Canada

Type section
- Named for: Ghost River
- Named by: C.D. Walcott, 1923

The Ghost River Formation is a now-abandoned name for a geologic formation that encompassed Cambrian to Middle Devonian strata in the Rocky Mountains of southwestern Alberta, Canada. It was established by C.D. Walcott in 1923. The name was abandoned because of uncertainty about the age of the strata that it encompassed.

The type section of the Ghost River Formation contained strata that are now subdivided into several Cambrian formations, unconformably overlain by Middle Devonian strata now assigned to the Yahatinda Formation. The latter are contained in a channel eroded into the Cambrian rocks and include a variety of plant fossils and remains of fresh water fish.

== See also ==
- List of fossiliferous stratigraphic units in Alberta
