= Flume Formation =

Geologic formation in Alberta, Canada

- Stratigraphic range: Frasnian
- Type: Formation
- Unit of: Fairholme Group
- Underlies: Cairn Formation
- Overlies: Cambrian or Ordovician formations, or Yahatinda Formation
- Thickness: Up to 125 m (410 ft)

Lithology
- Primary: Dolomite
- Other: Chert, limestone

Location
- Coordinates: 53°10′N 117°55′W
- Approximate paleocoordinates: 13.0°S 44.1°W
- Region: Alberta
- Country: Canada
- Extent: Western Canada Sedimentary Basin

Type section
- Named by: P.E. Raymond
- Year defined: 1930
- Flume Formation (Canada) Flume Formation (Alberta)

The Flume Formation is a geologic formation in the Western Canada Sedimentary Basin in Alberta, Canada. It was deposited as an extensive carbonate platform along the western edge of the basin during Late Devonian (Frasnian) time and the reefs of the Cairn Formation subsequently developed on it.

== Lithology ==
The Flume Formation was deposited as limestone, but it was strongly dolomitized during diagenesis, and it now consists primarily of dark grey, medium-to thick-bedded, fine to medium crystalline dolomite. It includes abundant dark grey chert nodules and stringers, as well as scattered stromatoporoids and Amphipora. It is distinguished from the overlying Cairn Formation by its higher chert content and lower fossil content. In areas where it is overlain by Cairn Formation reefs the Flume may be classified as the lower member of the Cairn Formation, but where the Cairn is absent the Flume has formation rank.

== Thickness and distribution ==
The Flume Formation reaches thicknesses of up to 125 m (410 ft). It has been exposed by thrust faulting in the main and front ranges of the Canadian Rockies in a belt extending from the Kakwa Lakes area in northeastern British Columbia to south of the Bow River in Alberta.

== Relationship to other units ==
The Flume Formation rests unconformably on formations of late Cambrian to Ordovician age or, in parts of the mountains and foothills, on the Middle Devonian Yahatinda Formation. It is conformably overlain by the reefs of the Cairn Formation, or where they are absent, by the Southesk Formation. It is equivalent in part to the upper Beaverhill Lake Group farther to the east.

== Fossil content ==
The formation has provided fossils of:

Brachiopods

- Atrypa sp.
- Schizophoria sp.
- Spinatrypa sp.
- Strophomena (Strophodonta) sp.

Corals

- Tarphyphyllum besti
- Tabulophyllum sp.
- ?Grypophyllum sp.
- Stromatoporoidea indet.

Flora

- Receptaculites sp.

== See also ==
- List of fossiliferous stratigraphic units in Alberta
- List of fossiliferous stratigraphic units in British Columbia
