= Hollebeke Formation =

Geologic formation in Canada

Borsato Formation
- Stratigraphic range: Frasnian; ~382–373 Ma
- Type: Formation
- Unit of: Fairholme Group
- Underlies: Borsato Formation
- Overlies: Ordovician or older formations
- Thickness: Up to about 240 m (790 ft)

Lithology
- Primary: Limestone, dolomite

Location
- Coordinates: 49°23′56″N 114°34′05″W
- Region: British Columbia; Alberta
- Country: Canada
- Extent: Western Canada Sedimentary Basin & southern Rocky Mountains

Type section
- Named for: Mount Hollebeke
- Named by: R.A. Price
- Year defined: 1965
- Hollebeke Formation (Canada) Hollebeke Formation (Alberta)

The Hollebeke Formation is a stratigraphic unit of Late Devonian (Frasnian) age. It is present on the western edge of the Western Canada Sedimentary Basin in the southern Rocky Mountains of Alberta and British Columbia. It consists of carbonate rocks, and was named for Mount Hollebeke in the Flathead Range near North Kootenay Pass by R.A. Price in 1965.

== Thickness and lithology ==
The Hollebeke Formation was deposited in a marine environment and ranges in thickness from about 100 to 240 m (328 to 787 ft). The lower part consists of locally silty or argillaceous dolomite and limestone. The upper part is very fine crystalline limestone.

== Distribution and relationship to other units ==
The Hollebeke Formation is present in Rocky Mountains of southeastern British Columbia and southwestern Alberta, west of the Lewis Thrust Fault and south of about 50°N latitude. It unconformably overlies Ordovician or Cambrian formations, or the late Precambrian Purcell Supergroup, depending on the location. It is overlain by the Borsato Formation.
