= Southesk Formation =

Geologic formation in Canada

- Stratigraphic range: late Frasnian
- Type: Formation
- Unit of: Fairholme Group
- Sub-units: Ronde Member; Arcs Member; Grotto Member; Peechee Member
- Underlies: Sassenach Formation, Alexo Formation, Palliser Formation, or Crowfoot Formation
- Overlies: Cairn Formation, or Borsato Formation
- Thickness: Up to about 300 m (1000 feet)

Lithology
- Primary: Dolomite
- Other: Limestone

Location
- Coordinates: 52°38′00″N 116°58′00″W
- Region: Alberta; British Columbia
- Country: Canada

Type section
- Named for: Southesk River
- Named by: D.J. McLaren, 1955.

The Southesk Formation is a stratigraphic unit of Late Devonian (late Frasnian) age. It is present on the western edge of the Western Canada Sedimentary Basin in the Rocky Mountains and foothills of Alberta and southeastern British Columbia. It was named for the Southesk River in Jasper National Park by D.J. McLaren in 1955.

The formation consists primarily of dolomite and it preserves fossils of marine animals such as stromatoporoids and rugose corals.

== Lithology and thickness ==
The Southesk Formation was deposited in reefal environments. It is commonly between 150 and 260 m (490 and 850 feet) thick, and reaches a maximum of about 300 m (1000 feet) in the Flathead area of southeastern British Columbia. It has been subdivided into four members, shown in descending order below.

| Member | Lithology | Max. thickness | Fossils | Reference |
|---|---|---|---|---|
| Ronde Member | limestone & silty limestone; present only in limited areas | 55 m (180 ft) | not fossiliferous | Glass, p. 1006 |
| Arcs Member | light grey, medium-bedded, medium-crystalline dolomite | 74 m (240 ft) | minor branching stromatoporoids, foraminifera, & algae | Glass, p. 62 |
| Grotto Member | thick- to thin-bedded, dark brown to grey, variably argillaceous dolomite | 67 m (220 ft) | branching stromatoporoids; tabulate corals | Glass, p. 533 |
| Peechee Member | massive, light grey, medium- to coarse-crystalline dolomite; minor limestone & anhydrite | 300 m (980 ft) | bulbous & branching stromatoporoids; tabulate corals | Glass, p. 915 |

== Distribution and relationship to other units ==
The Southesk Formation is discontinuously present in the Canadian Rockies from Jasper National Park to the Flathead area of southeastern British Columbia. It is also present in the subsurface beneath the adjacent plains to the east. It conformably overlies the Cairn Formation or, in the Crows Nest Pass area, the Borsato Formation. At its margins it may interfinger with the Perdrix and Mount Hawk Formations. In the mountains it is unconformably overlain by the Sassenach, the Alexo or, rarely, the Palliser Formation. It is overlain by the Crowfoot Formation in the plains.

== See also ==
- List of fossiliferous stratigraphic units in Alberta
