= Crowfoot Formation =

- Stratigraphic range: Frasnian
- Type: Geological formation
- Underlies: Stettler Formation
- Overlies: Southesk Formation
- Thickness: up to 38 metres (120 ft)

Lithology
- Primary: Anhydrite, dolomite
- Other: Shale

Location
- Coordinates: 50.748°N 112.587°W
- Region: Alberta; Western Canadian Sedimentary Basin
- Country: Canada

Type section
- Named for: Crowfoot Creek
- Named by: H.R. Belyea and D.J. McLaren, 1957

The Crowfoot Formation is a stratigraphic unit of Frasnian age in the Western Canadian Sedimentary Basin.

It takes the name from Crowfoot Creek, a tributary of the Bow River and was first described in the Royalite Crowfoot No. 2 well, located near the creek by H.R. Belyea and D.J. McLaren in 1957.

== Lithology ==
The Crowfoot Formation consists of anhydrite, silty dolomite, with minor shale.

== Distribution ==
The Crowfoot Formation is typically 4 metres (10 ft) thick, but can reach up to 38 metres (120 ft).

== Relationship to other units ==
The Crowfoot Formation is overlain by the Stettler Formation and overlays the Southesk Formation.

It is equivalent to the Calmar Formation and part of the Graminia Formation in central Alberta and to the Torquay Formation in Saskatchewan, Manitoba and Montana.
