= Mount Hawk Formation =

Geologic formation in Alberta, Canada

- Stratigraphic range: late Frasnian
- Type: Formation
- Unit of: Fairholme Group
- Underlies: Sassenach Formation, Alexo Formation, or Southesk Formation
- Overlies: Perdrix Formation or Borsato Formation
- Thickness: Up to about 200 m (650 feet)

Lithology
- Primary: Limestone
- Other: Shale, mudstone

Location
- Coordinates: 53°10′00″N 117°55′00″W
- Region: Alberta
- Country: Canada

Type section
- Named for: Hawk Mountain
- Named by: R. de Wit and D.J. McLaren, 1950.

The Mount Hawk Formation is a stratigraphic unit of Late Devonian (late Frasnian) age. It is present on the western edge of the Western Canada Sedimentary Basin in the Rocky Mountains and foothills of Alberta. It consists primarily of limestone and mudstone, and was named for Hawk Mountain in Jasper National Park by R. de Wit and D.J. McLaren in 1950.

The Mount Hawk Formation is fossiliferous and preserves remains of marine animals such as Syringopora and other corals, and brachiopods.

== Lithology and deposition ==
The Mount Hawk Formation was deposited in a marine basin surrounding the carbonate buildups (reefs) of the Southesk Formation. It can be divided into two informal units. The lower unit consists of thin-bedded argillaceous limestone interbedded with calcareous shale. It grades into the upper unit, which consists of thin- to medium-bedded limestone with minor thin interbeds of argillaceous limestone.

== Distribution and thickness ==
The Mount Hawk Formation is recognized in the Rocky Mountains and foothills of Alberta from the Canada-United States border northward to at least the Smoky River area of west-central Alberta, a distance of more than 650 km (400 mi). It ranges in thickness from about 65 to 200 m (210 to 655 ft).

== Relationship to other units ==
The upper and lower boundaries of the Mount Hawk Formation were redefined several times after the formation was first described in 1950. The formation conformably overlies the Perdrix Formation or, in the Crows Nest Pass area, the Borsato Formation. It is overlain by Sassenach Formation. It is laterally equivalent to the reefal carbonate rocks of the Southesk Formation, and in some areas it interfingers with or is overlain by the Southesk.

== See also ==
- List of fossiliferous stratigraphic units in Alberta
