= Cairn Formation =

Geologic formation in Canada

- Stratigraphic range: Frasnian; ~382–373 Ma
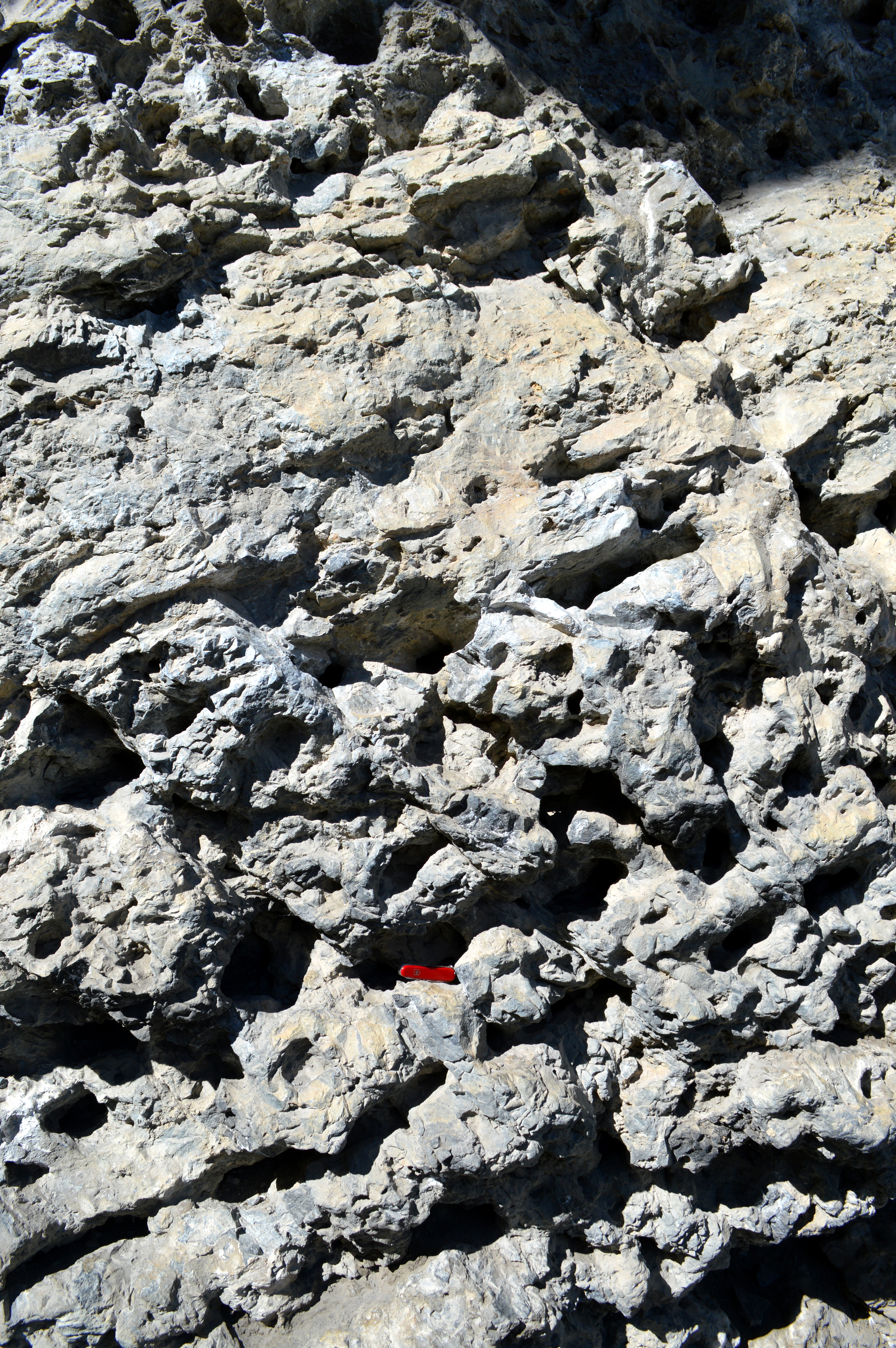
- Cairn Formation dolomite with bulbous stromatoporoids. The red pocket knife is 9 cm (3.5 in) long.
- Type: Formation
- Unit of: Fairholme Group
- Underlies: Southesk Formation
- Overlies: Flume Formation
- Thickness: Up to 180 m (590 ft)

Lithology
- Primary: Dolomite
- Other: Limestone, chert

Location
- Coordinates: 52°38′N 116°58′W
- Approximate paleocoordinates: 13.5°S 44.4°W
- Region: Alberta
- Country: Canada

Type section
- Named for: Cairn River, Alberta
- Named by: D.J. McLaren
- Year defined: 1955
- Cairn Formation (Canada) Cairn Formation (Alberta)

The Cairn Formation is a geologic formation of Late Devonian (Frasnian) age in the Western Canada Sedimentary Basin. It was named for the Cairn River near its junction with the Southesk River in Jasper National Park by D.J. McLaren in 1955.

The Cairn Formation is stratigraphically equivalent to the Leduc Formation, which is a major oil-producing formation in central Alberta. Like the Leduc Formation, it was deposited in reef environments and is highly fossiliferous. Extensive outcrops of the Cairn Formation near Canmore, Alberta are a popular field trip destination for those wishing to learn about Devonian reefs. They are also popular with rock climbers who enjoy the challenges presented by their extremely irregular surfaces.

== Lithology ==
The Cairn Formation was originally deposited as limestones and mudstones in intertidal to subtidal reef environments, and was extensively dolomitized during later diagenesis. It now consists primarily of buff to dark grey, very fine to medium grained crystalline dolomite with good intercrystalline, biomoldic and vuggy porosity. Most of it is classified as floatstone, with stromatoporoids and other fossils supported in a dolomite matrix. The Cairn also includes minor amounts of undolomitized limestone and chert.

== Paleontology ==
Bulbous stromatoporoids are particularly common in the Cairn Formation and were the main reef-building organism. There are also tabular stromatoporoids, Amphipora, horn corals, tabulate corals such as Thamnopora, brachiopods, crinoids, algae and foraminifera. The organisms are commonly either in growth position or have only been moved short distances. Some stromatoporoids show evidence of bioerosion by boring sponges.

== Thickness and distribution ==
The Cairn Formation typically ranges from 80 m (260 ft) to 180 m (590 ft) in thickness. It occurs in outcrop in the front and main ranges of the Canadian Rockies from Kakwa Lake in northeastern British Columbia to south of the Bow River in Alberta. It is also recognized in the subsurface in some areas.

== Relationship to other units ==
The Cairn Formation rests conformably on the Flume Formation, which is considered to be the lower member of the Cairn Formation in some areas, and it is overlain by the Peechee Member of the Southesk Formation. At reef margins the Cairn may interfinger with the Perdrix Formation which was deposited in deeper water, off-reef environments.

The Cairn Formation is equivalent to, but not contiguous with, the lower Leduc Formation which lies farther to the east in central Alberta. It is also equivalent to the Cooking Lake Formation in central Alberta, and to the lower Duperow Formation and possibly the upper Souris River Formation in the Williston Basin. Its relationship to units in the Crowsnest Pass area of southern Alberta has not been established.

== Gallery ==
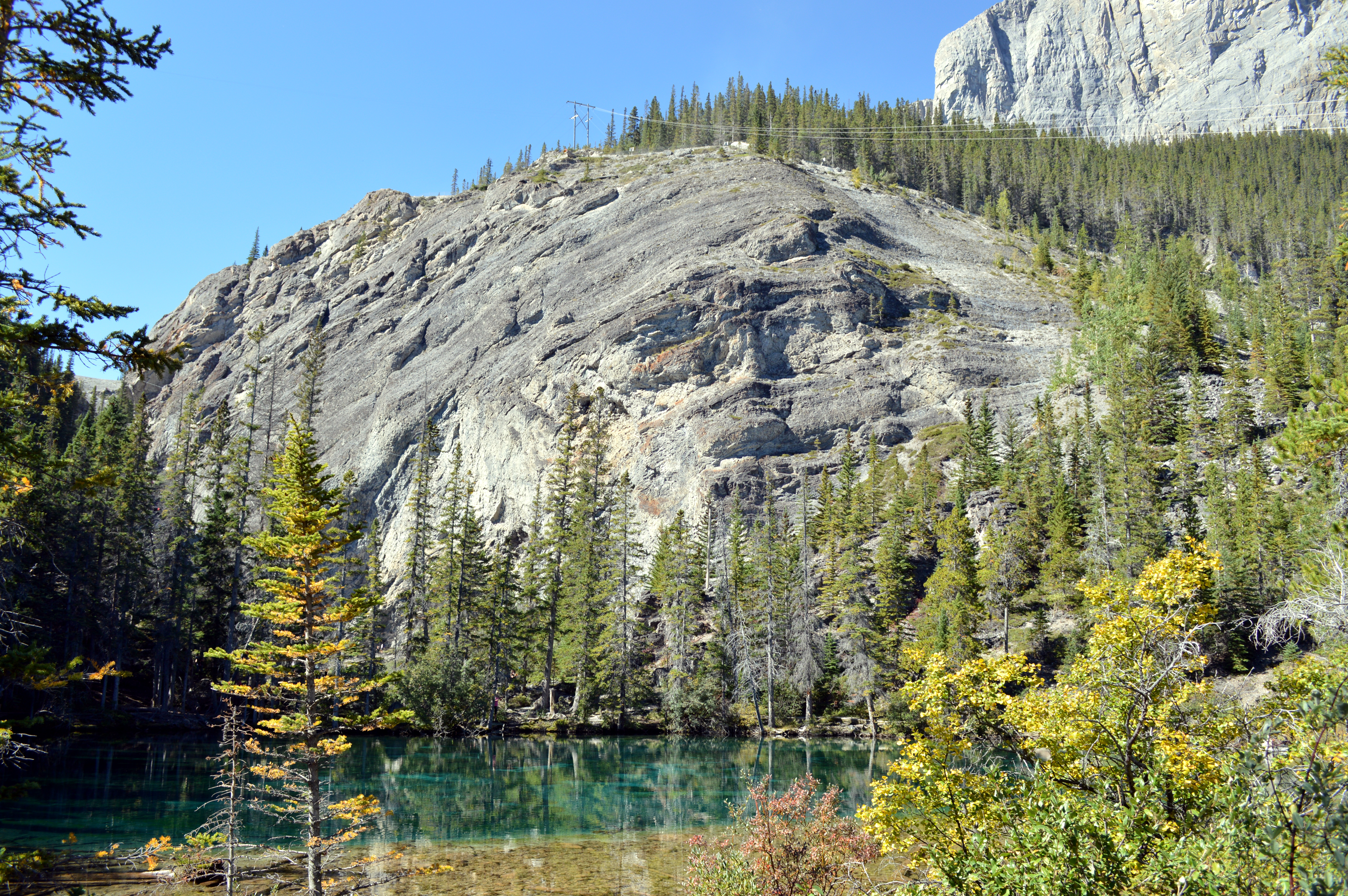
Cairn Formation outcrop at Grassi Lakes, near Canmore, Alberta, Canada.

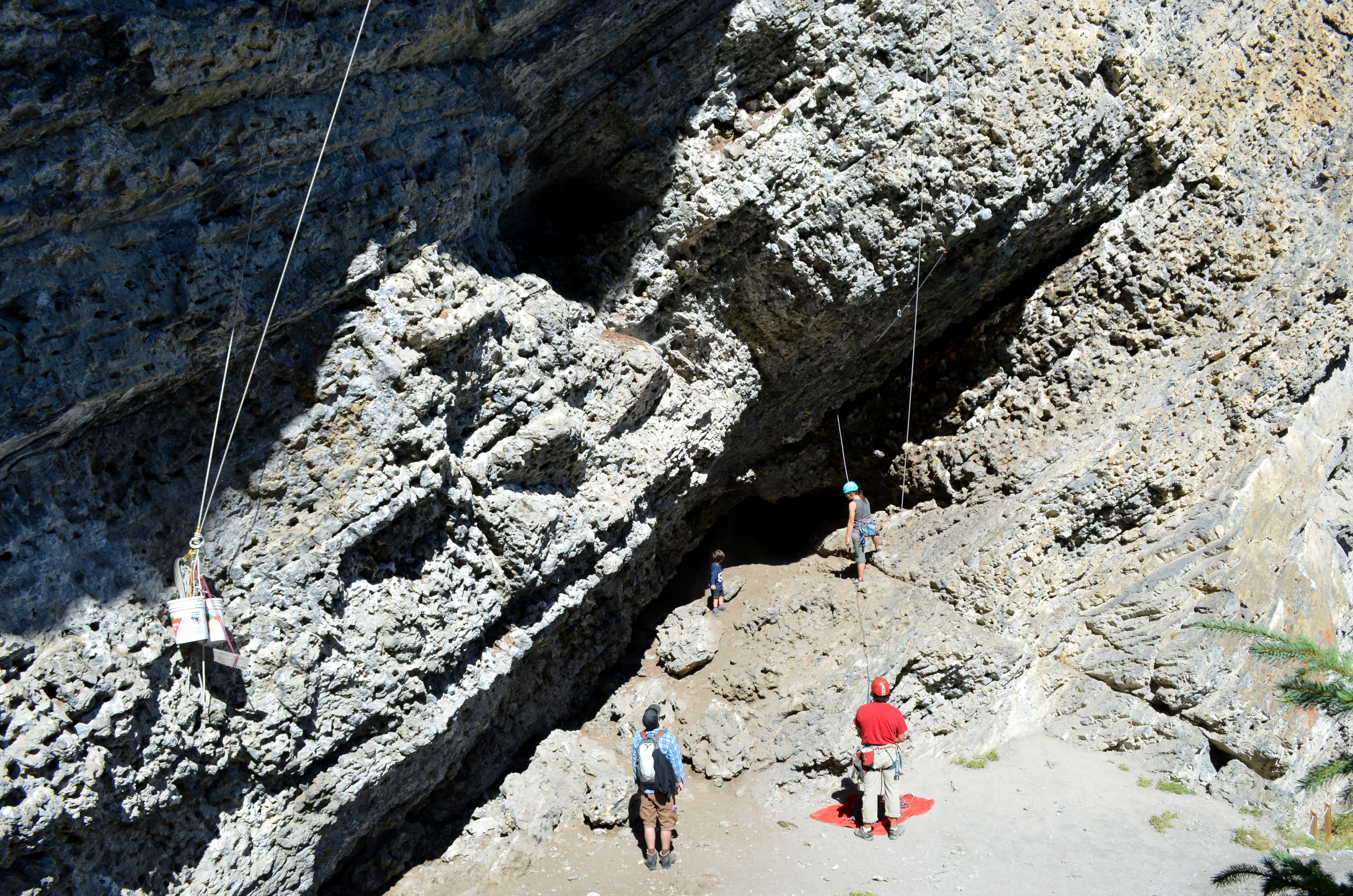
Rock climbing on the Cairn Formation at Grassi Lakes.

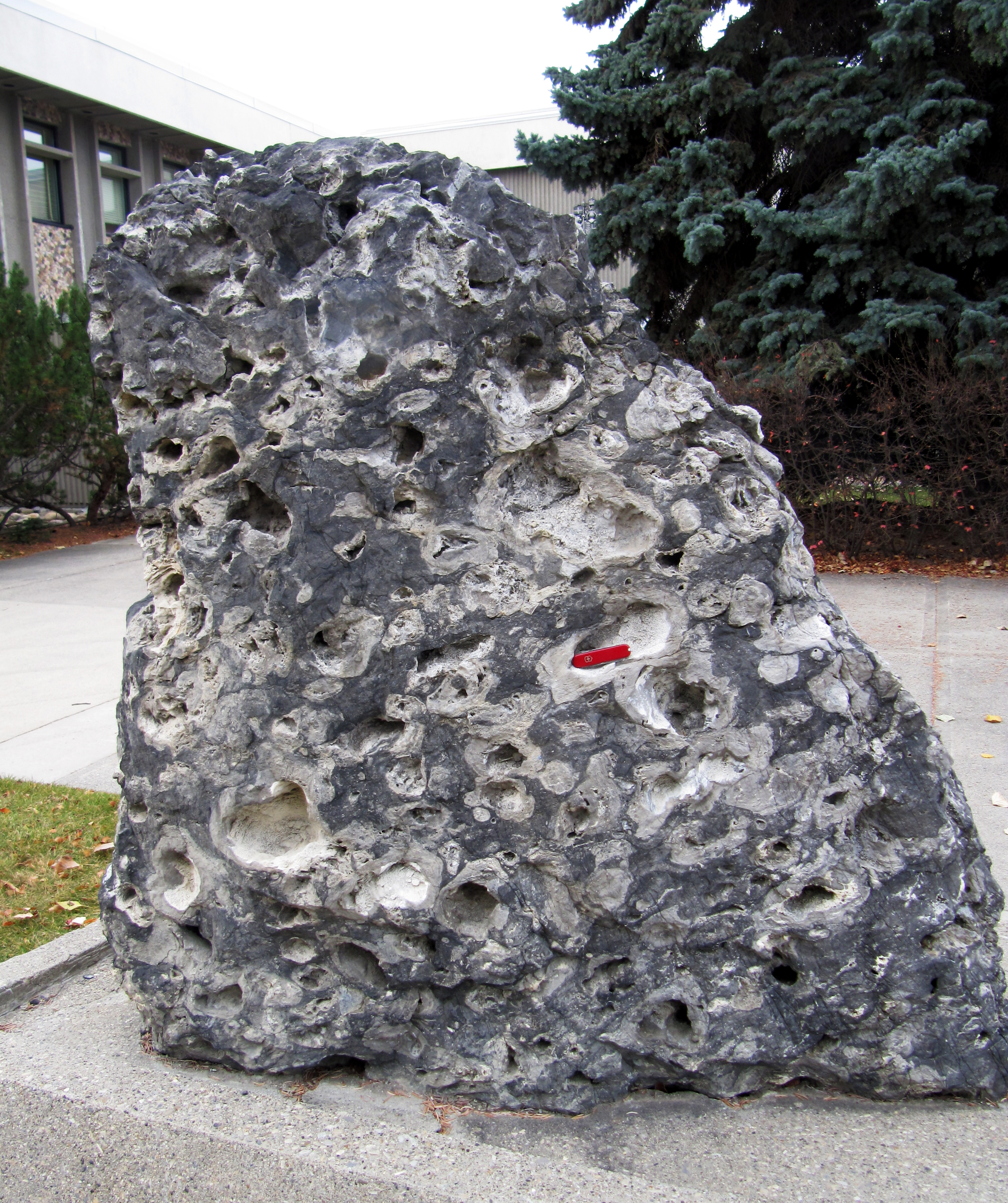
Cairn Formation stromatoporoid reef displayed in Calgary.

== See also ==
- List of fossiliferous stratigraphic units in Alberta
- List of fossiliferous stratigraphic units in British Columbia
