= Alexo Formation =

Geologic formation in Alberta, Canada

- Stratigraphic range: late Frasnian to early Famennian
- Type: Formation
- Underlies: Palliser Formation
- Overlies: Southesk Formation, Mount Hawk Formation
- Thickness: Up to about 100 metres (330 ft)

Lithology
- Primary: Dolomite
- Other: Siltstone

Location
- Coordinates: 52°26′00″N 115°54′00″W
- Region: Alberta
- Country: Canada

Type section
- Named for: Alexo, Alberta
- Named by: R. de Wit and D.J. McLaren, 1950.

The Alexo Formation a stratigraphic unit of Late Devonian (late Frasnian to early Famennian) age. It is present on the western edge of the Western Canada Sedimentary Basin in the central Rocky Mountains and foothills of Alberta. The formation consists primarily of dolomite. It is locally fossiliferous and includes remains of marine animals such as brachiopods and conodonts.

== Lithology and thickness ==
The Alexo Formation was deposited in a marine setting and consists of dolomite, silty and argillaceous dolomite, dolomitic siltstone, and vuggy dolomite. It has a maximum thickness of about 100 metres (330 ft), and is thinner in areas where it covers carbonate buildups (reefs) in the underlying formations.

== Distribution and relationship to other units ==
The Alexo Formation is present in the central Rocky Mountains of Alberta and the adjacent foothills, extending from the Crows Nest Pass area in the south to the North Saskatchewan River in the north. It overlies the Southesk or Mount Hawk Formation, depending on the location. It is overlain by the Palliser Formation.

The Alexo was originally considered to extend as far north as Jasper but was revised by McLaren and Mountjoy in 1962. In the area between the North Saskatchewan River and Jasper, they designated the upper beds of the Alexo as the Sassenach Formation, and the lower beds as part of the upper Southesk Formation.

== See also ==
- List of fossiliferous stratigraphic units in Alberta
