= Trypanites =

Trace fossil classification
- Ichnofamily: †Trypanitidae
- Ichnogenus: †Trypanites; Mägdefrau, 1932

Type ichnospecies
- Trypanites weisei Mägdefrau, 1932

Ichnospecies
- T. fosteryeomani Cole & Palmer, 1999; T. mobilis Neumann et al., 2008; T. solitarius (von Hagenow, 1840); T. weisei Mägdefrau, 1932

Synonyms
- Clionoides Fenton & Fenton, 1932; Nygmites Mägdefrau, 1937; Conchifora Müller, 1968; Cylindrocavites Ghare, 1982; Anoigmaichnus Vinn et al., 2014

Trace fossil

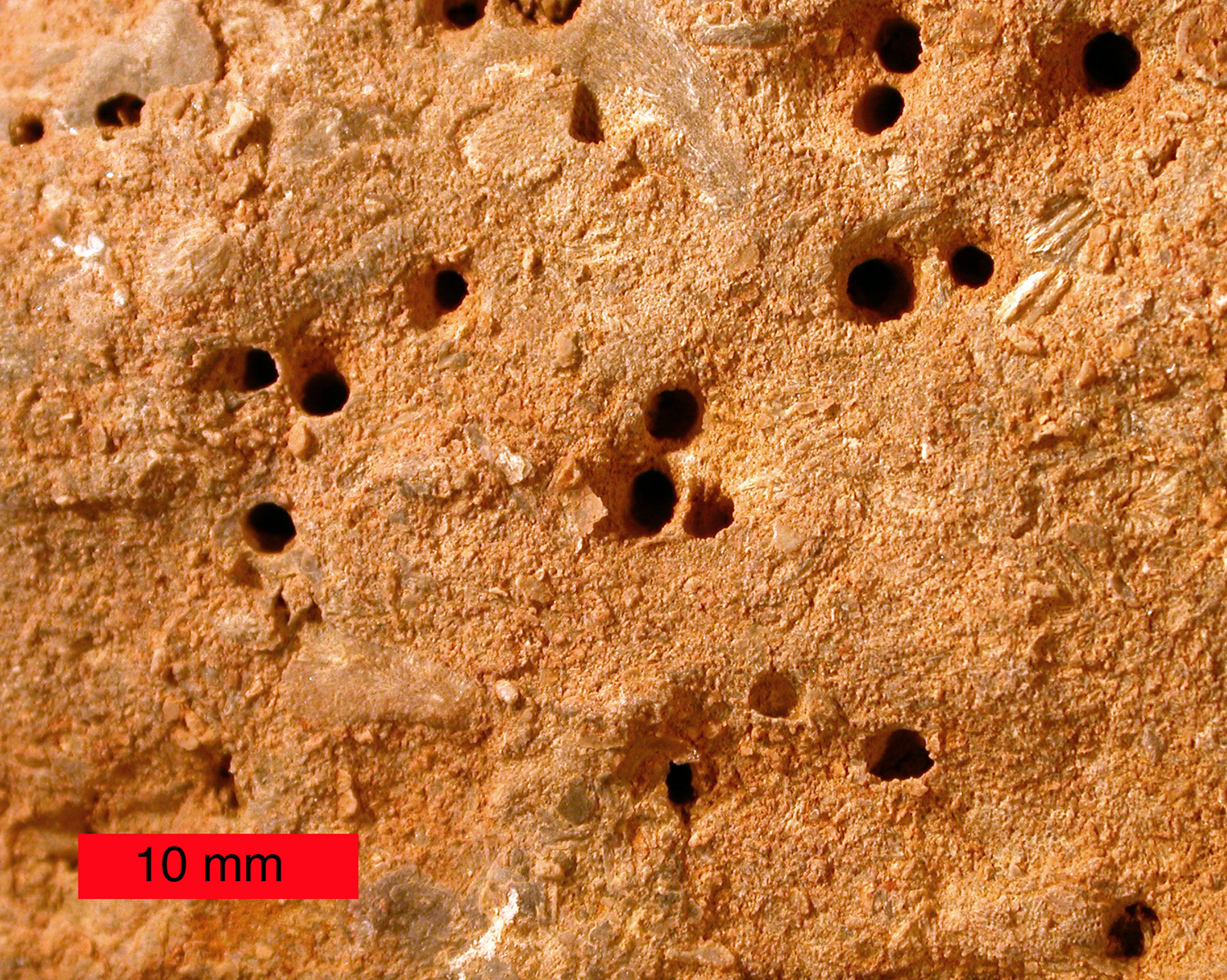
Trypanites borings in an Upper Ordovician hardground from northern Kentucky.

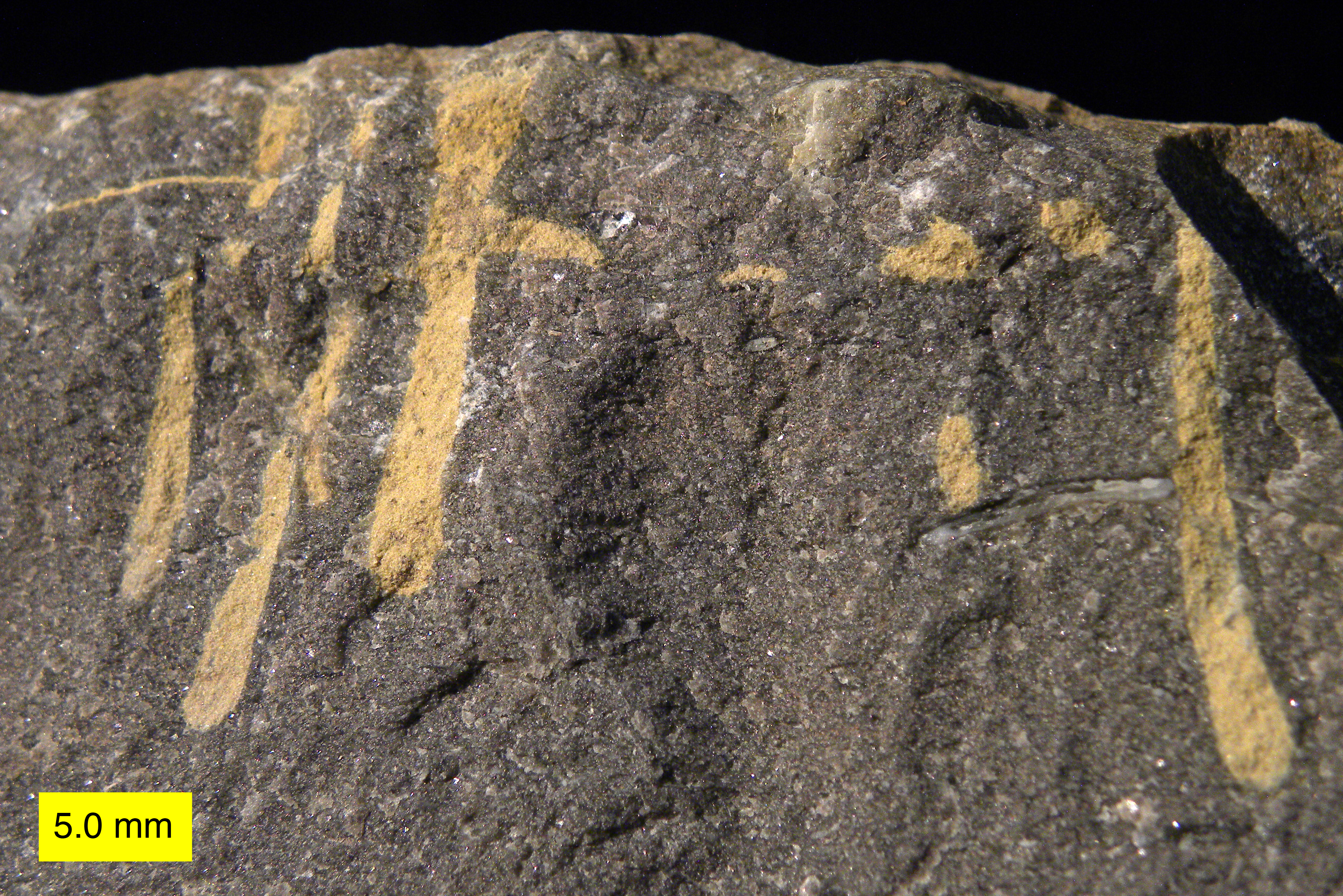
Trypanites borings in an Upper Ordovician hardground from northern Kentucky. The borings are filled with diagenetic dolomite (yellowish). Note that the boring on the far right cuts through a shell in the matrix.

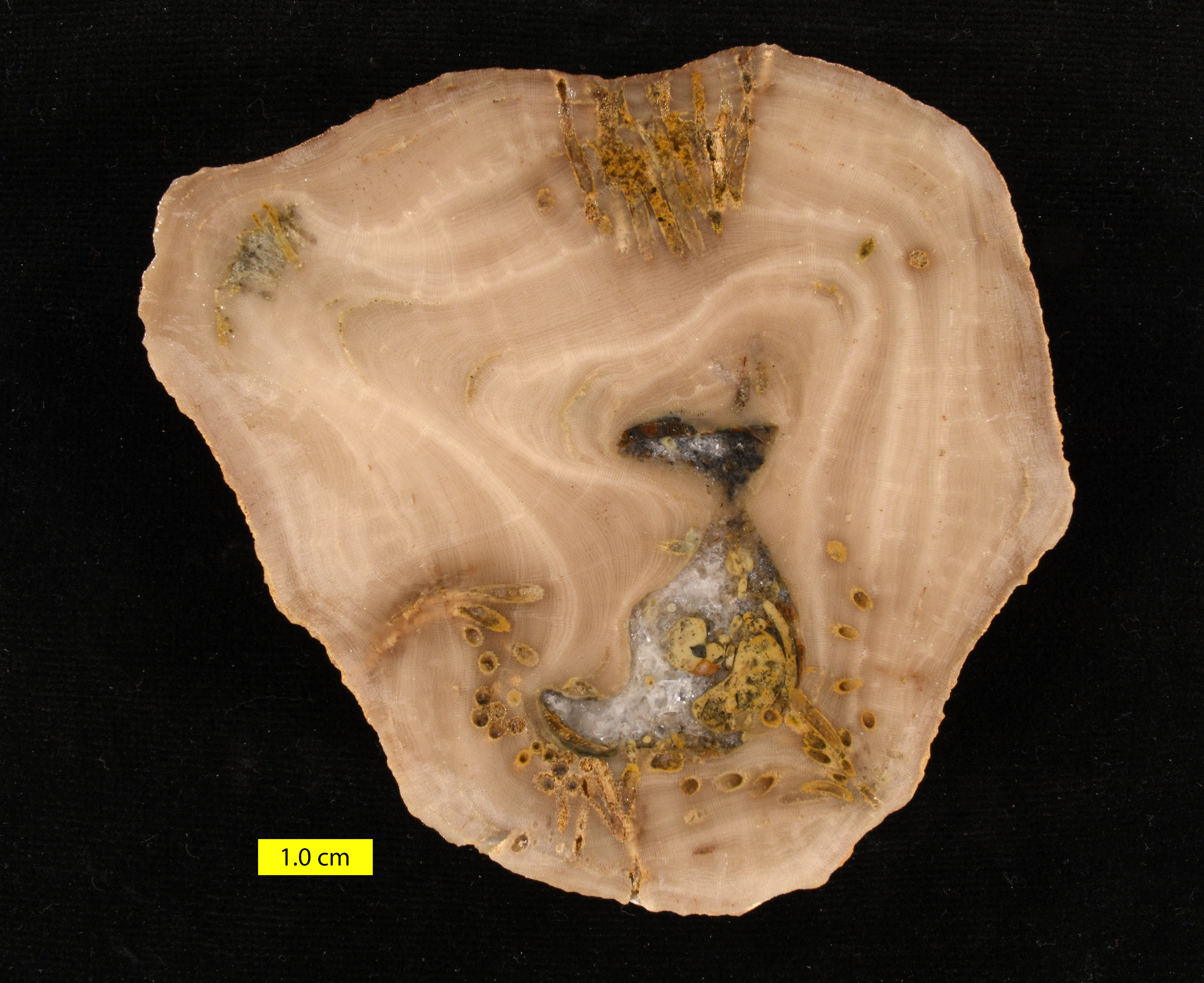
Polished section of the Upper Ordovician bryozoan Amplexopora with clusters of Trypanites borings; northern Kentucky.

Trypanites is a narrow, cylindrical, unbranched boring which is one of the most common trace fossils in hard substrates such as rocks, carbonate hardgrounds and shells. It appears first in the Lower Cambrian, was very prominent in the Ordovician Bioerosion Revolution, and is still commonly formed today. Trypanites is almost always found in calcareous substrates, most likely because the excavating organism used an acid or other chemical agent to dissolve the calcium carbonate. Trypanites is common in the Ordovician and Silurian hardgrounds of Baltica.
