= Sassenach Formation =

Geologic formation in Alberta, Canada

- Stratigraphic range: early Famennian
- Type: Formation
- Underlies: Palliser Formation
- Overlies: Mount Hawk Formation, Southesk Formation
- Thickness: Up to about 245 metres (800 ft)

Lithology
- Primary: Mudstone, siltstone
- Other: Limestone, dolomite

Location
- Coordinates: 53°10′00″N 118°14′00″W
- Region: Alberta
- Country: Canada

Type section
- Named for: Mount Sassenach
- Named by: D.J. McLaren and E.W. Mountjoy, 1962.

The Sassenach Formation is a stratigraphic unit of Late Devonian (early Famennian) age. It is present on the western edge of the Western Canada Sedimentary Basin in the Rocky Mountains and foothills of Alberta. It consists primarily of mudstone, siltstone, and silty carbonate rocks, and was named for Mount Sassenach in Jasper National Park by D. J. McLaren and E. W. Mountjoy in 1962.

The Sassenach Formation was deposited near the beginning of the Fammenian stage of the Devonian, following the Frasnian–Fammenian extinction event. It includes fossil conodonts.

== Lithology and thickness ==
The Sassenach Formation was deposited below wave base in an off-reef marine setting. It consists of silty to sandy mudstone and siltstone, with argillaceous to silty and sandy limestone and dolomite. It has a maximum thickness of about 245 metres (800 ft).

== Distribution and relationship to other units ==
The Sassenach Formation is present in the Rocky Mountains and foothills of Alberta, extending from northern Jasper National Park to the North Saskatchewan River, and it has also been tentatively recognized in some areas farther south. It overlies the Southesk Formation or the Mount Hawk Formation, depending on the location. It is overlain by the Palliser Formation, and is laterally equivalent to the upper beds of the Alexo Formation.
