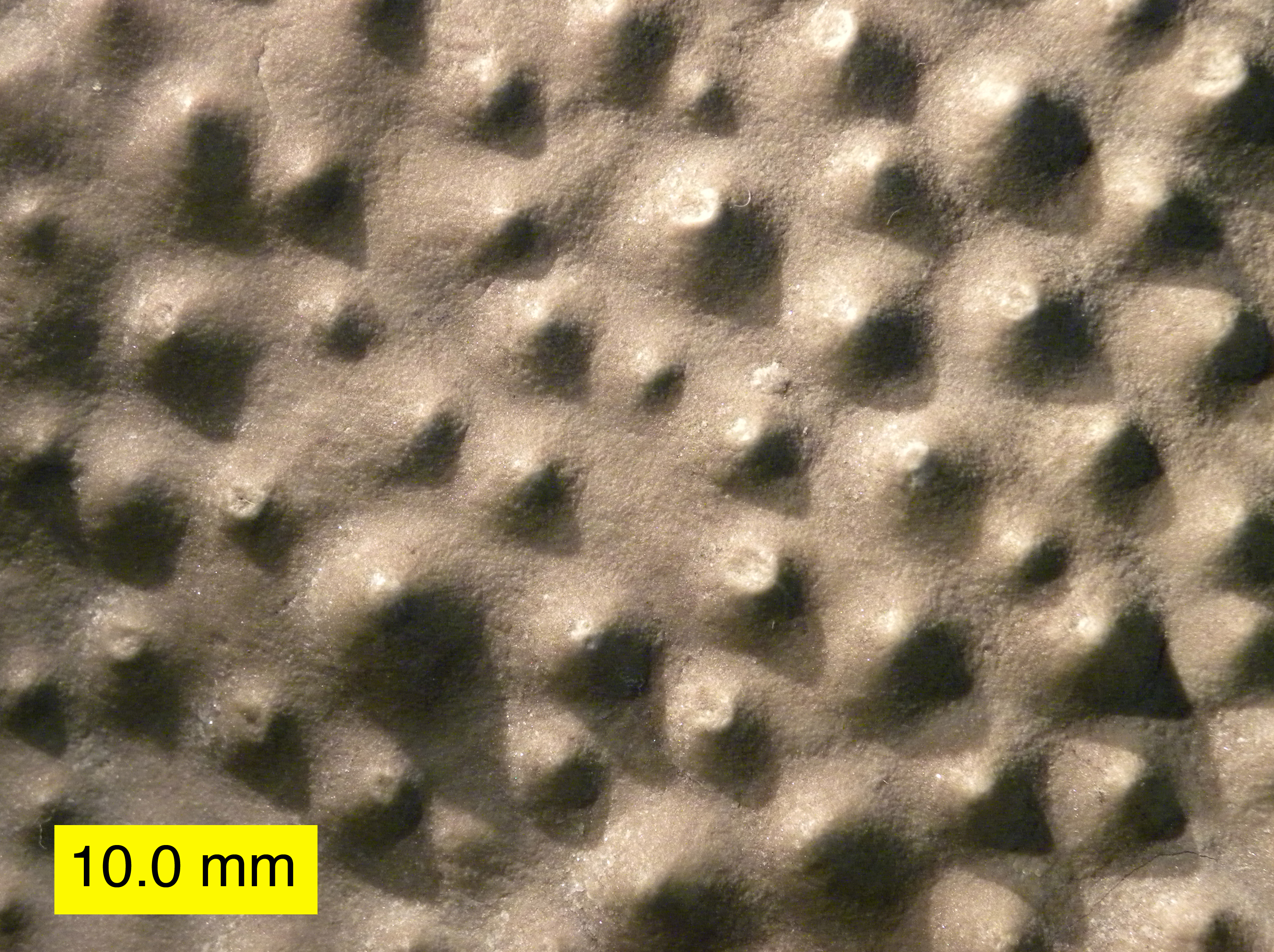
- Top view of a stromatoporoid with prominent mamelons. From the Columbus Limestone (Middle Devonian) of Ohio.

Scientific classification
- Kingdom: Animalia
- Phylum: Porifera
- Class: †Stromatoporoidea; Nicholson & Murie, 1878

= Stromatoporoidea =

Stromatoporoidea Temporal range: Early Ordovician (Tremadocian)–Late Devonian (Famennian) Possible persistence into the Carboniferous. Mesozoic identifications are likely unrelated to the main Paleozoic radiation

Extinct clade of reef-building sponges

Stromatoporoidea is an extinct clade of sea sponges common in the fossil record from the Middle Ordovician to the Late Devonian. They can be characterized by their densely layered calcite skeletons lacking spicules. Stromatoporoids were among the most abundant and important reef-builders of their time, living close together in flat biostromes or elevated bioherms on soft tropical carbonate platforms.

Externally, some species have raised bumps (mamelons) and star-shaped crevices (astrorhizae), which together help vent exhalant water away from the living surface. Internally, stromatoporoids have a mesh-like skeletal system combining extensive horizontal layers (laminae), vertical rods (pillars), and boxy spaces (galleries), along with other features. The most common growth forms range from laminar (flattened) to domical (dome-shaped). Spheroidal, finger-like, or tree-like species also occur, though they are rare in most environments.

Stromatoporoids competed and coexisted with other reef-builders such as tabulate and rugose corals. Some stromatoporoid species are useful as environmental proxies, since their form and distribution can help approximate the depositional environment of sedimentary strata. They hosted a diverse fauna of encrusting symbionts both within and outside their skeletons. Some studies have argued that stromatoporoids were mixotrophs (engaged in a mutualistic relationship with photosynthetic algae), similar to modern scleractinian corals. Though this hypothesis is plausible, circumstantial evidence is inconclusive.

Prior to the 1970s, stromatoporoids were most frequently equated with colonial hydrozoans in the phylum Cnidaria (which also includes corals, sea anemones, and jellyfish). They are now classified as sponges in the phylum Porifera, based on their similarity to modern sclerosponges. True Paleozoic stromatoporoids (sensu stricto) encompass seven orders. Two or three of these orders appeared in the Ordovician while the rest evolved in the Silurian. They rediversified subsequent to mass extinctions at the end of the Ordovician and Silurian, but a more profound decline began in the Late Devonian. With a few putative exceptions, they apparently died out during the Hangenberg event at the end of the Devonian. A number of hypercalcified Mesozoic sponges have been classified as stromatoporoids, but they are likely unrelated to the Paleozoic radiation, thus making 'stromatoporoids' (in the broad sense) a polyphyletic group if they are included. Some Carboniferous sponges have been identified as stromatoporoids with a somewhat greater degree of confidence.

== Morphology ==
Stromatoporoids are robust sponges with a dense calcite skeleton lacking spicules. Like other sponges, they grow outwards and upwards from a single base attached firmly to the substrate. Most were ambitopic (occupying soft substrate such as mud or sand for most of their life), though some were encrusting (concreted onto hard substrates such as rocks or other organisms). The base was stabilized by a crust-like layer covered with concentric wrinkles. The basal layer has historically been termed an epitheca or peritheca, names used for a similar attachment layer in sessile cnidarians.

In many species, the upper surface of the skeleton is ornamented with small mounds known as mamelons. A few species may supplement the mamelons with radiating cracks or grooves known as astrorhizae. Internally, the astrorhizae diverge as independent tapering tubes that intersect smaller open spaces within the skeletal frame. Astrorhizae are generally equated with the exhalant canals of other sponges, while the mamelons help to channel waste water away from the surface. This mechanism works via Bernoulli's principle, which states that flow pressure increases as speed decreases, such as when the flow is redirected by a vertical barrier. The surface may also be covered with even smaller bumps known as papillae. In contrast to mamelons, papillae are simply external extensions of internal pillars, rather than stacked deflections of the skeleton's outer surface.

=== Internal structures ===
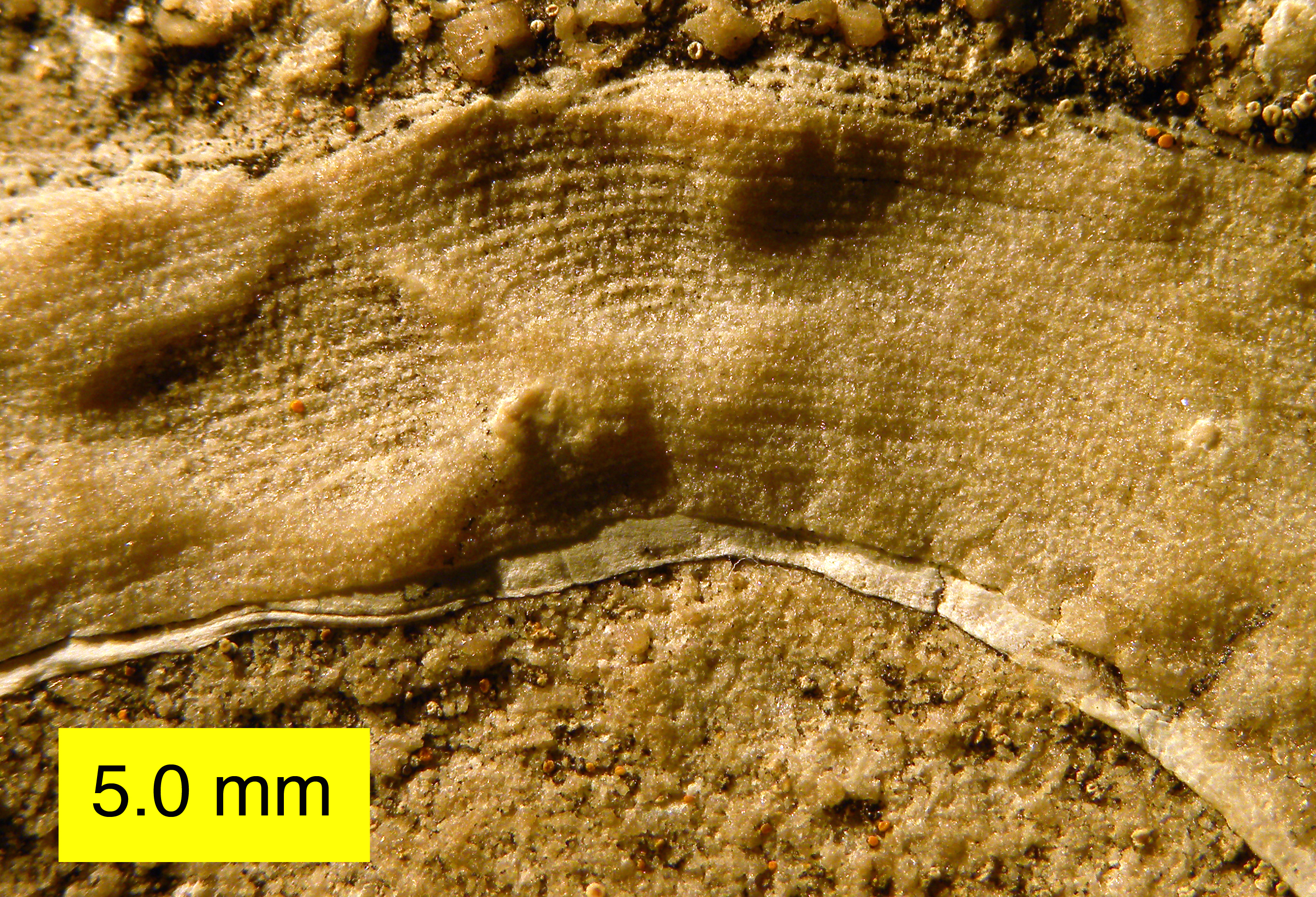
Side view of a stromatoporoid showing laminae, pillars, and galleries. From the Columbus Limestone (Middle Devonian) of Ohio.

By comparison to modern sponges with a similar anatomy, living tissue was likely only present at the outer surface of the stromatoporoid skeleton. By volume, the majority of the organism was a dead mesh of internal cavities and support structures. Since most stromatoporoid fossils are only visible in vertical or horizontal cross-section, the internal form of the skeleton is usually the most important region for the purpose of species differentiation. In all species, the most conspicuous internal features are laminae, layers arranged transversely (parallel to the living surface of the sponge). Laminae have an intermediate width and spacing (on average around four per millimeter) relative to other layers with the same orientation. Significantly thinner layers, when present, are termed microlaminae, while thickened irregular plates are termed pachystromes. Another universal type of internal structure are pillars, cylindrical rods oriented longitudinally (i.e., perpendicular to the laminae). Laminae and pillars are often straight and internally solid, but they can exhibit distinctive textures and distortions in some subgroups.

The cubical open spaces among the laminae and pillar meshwork are known as galleries. In life the galleries would have been filled with seawater, while in fossils the spaces are filled by recrystallized calcite. The galleries may be supplemented by very fine curved plates, termed dissepiments. Some species have more complex skeletons with broader pockets beyond the narrow galleries. Pachysteles are longitudinal walls which demarcate maze-like corridors, as visible in a transverse cross-section through the skeleton. Stacked dome-shaped pockets, known as cysts, are defined by large convex plates, known as cyst plates.

=== Growth forms ===
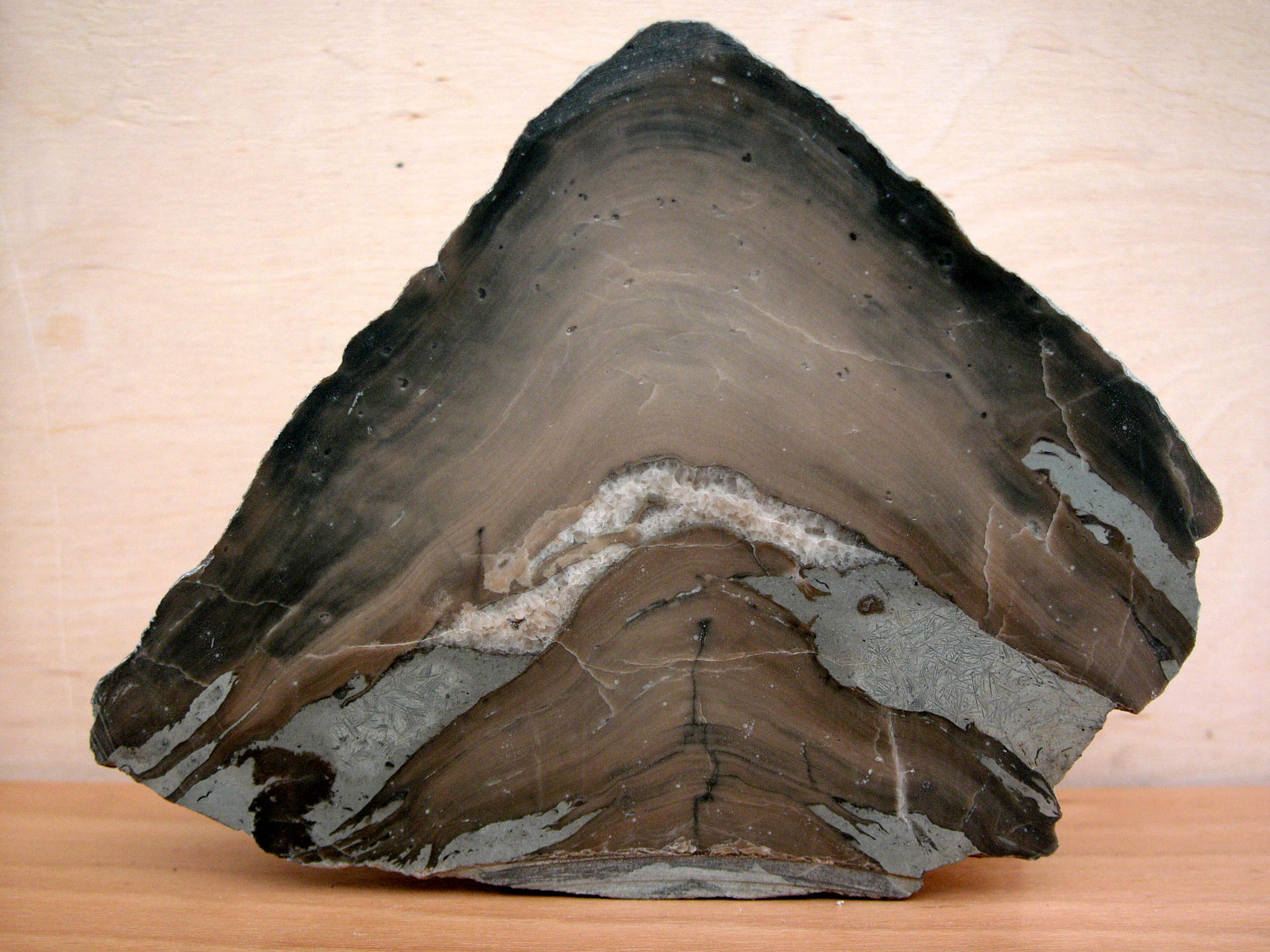
A vertical cross-section through a domical stromatoporoid, showing stacked 'ragged' growth. From the Silurian of Gotland, Sweden

Stromatoporoids can show a variety of growth forms, with low domes or plates as the most common varieties. Whenever an influx of sediment buries the edge of the skeleton, the buried portion ceases growing while the exposed central portion expands outwards to cover the sediment once more. This can create a 'ragged' appearance for some fossils, akin to an inverted stack of bowls or plates with sharp lower edges and smoothly curved upper edges. This is one example of how stromatoporoid growth forms can vary somewhat through the animal's lifespan. A single species can acquire a taller, narrower form to survive high sedimentation rates, while acquiring a flatter and more stable form to survive in energetic shallow waters. Some stromatoporoids appear to grow intermittently in a 'ragged' style even without sediment burial, as indicated by an abundance of encrusters under the overhanging 'shelves'.

Stromatoporoid growth forms include:

- Laminar – Sheet- or plate-shaped, with a broad base and a thin, flat skeleton expanding outwards along the substrate. Sheet-like forms with a slightly thicker profile are sometimes labelled 'tabular'.
- Domical – Dome- or mound-shaped, with a curved surface developing both outwards and upwards from a broad base. Domes occupy a spectrum from low (height less than half of the base's diameter) to high (height up to double the diameter). Some high domical species taper significantly, acquiring a conical shape.
- Bulbous – Bulb-shaped, with a narrow base widening upwards into a semi-spherical mass.
- Columnar – Cylindrical, tall (height more than double the diameter) and trunk-like, without branches. In many cases the outer wall of the column is reinforced with laminar outgrowths. One example of a columnar stromatoporoid is Aulacera, a very large aulaceratid from the Late Ordovician of Anticosti Island, Quebec.
- Digitate – Hand-shaped, with finger-like columns clustered together above a broad shared base.
- Dendroid – Bush-shaped, with a thicket of narrow columns branching away from a narrow base.
- Digitolaminar – A composite form combining both digitate and laminar characteristics. Finger-like projections are superimposed onto one or more flat plate-like platforms.
- Irregular – A composite form without an easily characterized shape. Both vertical and horizontal growth habits may be apparent in a single skeleton, with domes, platforms, and columns interspersed throughout the development of the sponge.

== Classification ==
=== Taxonomy ===
From Stearn et al. (1999) and The Treatise on Invertebrate Paleontology:

- Order Actinostromatida [Upper Ordovician? (Katian) – Upper Devonian (Frasnian)]
- Order Amphiporida [late Silurian (Ludlow) – Upper Devonian (Famennian)]
- Order Clathrodictyida [Upper Ordovician (Katian) – Upper Devonian (Famennian), Upper Mississippian? (Serpukhovian)]
- Order Labechiida [Lower Ordovician (Tremadocian) – Upper Devonian (Famennian), Triassic?]
- Order Stromatoporellida [latest Silurian (Pridoli) – Upper Devonian (Famennian)]
- Order Stromatoporida [early Silurian (upper Llandovery) – Upper Devonian (Frasnian)]
- Order Syringostromatida [middle Silurian (Wenlock) – Middle Devonian (Givetian), Upper Devonian? (Famennian)]
- incertae sedis:
  - Clavidictyon
  - Eostachyodes
  - Lamellistroma
  - Paschkoviella
  - Perplexostroma
  - Praeidiostroma
  - Pseudactinostroma
  - Pseudostromatopora?
  - Taymyrostroma

=== Affinities ===
Like many fossil invertebrates, stromatoporoids have long been regarded as an enigmatic group with an uncertain relationship to modern taxa. For much of their history of study, stromatoporoid fossils could only be observed externally or through natural cross-sections. Several hypotheses developed in the 19th and 20th centuries based on this limited set of data. A few authors suggested that stromatoporoids were sponges or relatives of Gypsina (an encrusting foraminifera). However, for much of their history the mainstream interpretation was that stromotoporoids were colonial cnidarians, most closely related to mineralized hydrozoans such as Hydractinia and Millepora. Hydractinia in particular has a thinly encrusting layered skeleton, augmented by internal rods, external knobs, and radiating nutrient canals. These features were equated with pillars, mamelons, and astrorhizae, respectively.

In 1970, several living sponges were found to possess a calcareous skeletal framework very similar to Hydractinia and stromatoporoids. The modern sponges, collectively termed sclerosponges, immediately reinvigorated the hypothesis that stromatoporoids were sponges. Moreover, closer investigations of stromatoporoid fossils were able to determine that an individual mound represents a single animal, rather than a colonial congregation of polyps. Among the strongest evidence for sponge affinities was the degree of similarity between astrorhizae and exhalant canals, which were easier to homologize than the more integrated canal system of Hydractinia.

Proponents of the sponge hypothesis admitted that sclerosponges and stromatoporoids were not identical in structure; for example, sclerosponges have spicules while true Paleozoic stromatoporoids do not. Several other enigmatic calcareous fossils (archaeocyathids, disjectoporids, 'chaetetids') have been reclassified as sponges thanks to this new information. The sponge hypothesis quickly met widespread acceptance, with a few detractors. Up until the 1990s, some Soviet and Eastern Bloc specialists continued to regard stromatoporoids as cnidarians or cyanobacterial accumulations akin to stromatolites or thrombolites.

== Evolution ==
=== Origination ===
The first unambiguous stromatoporoids appeared in the Ordovician, but superficially similar organisms have been reported from the Early Cambrian. These are most likely cases of convergent evolution rather than true forerunners. One example were the Kazachstanicyathida, an order of archaeocyath sponges with low growth habits and porous internal domes comparable to cyst plates. In addition, some colonial coralomorphs or algae (Maldeotaina, Yaworipora, and the 'khasaktiids') acquired mesh-like encrusting skeletons with a set of internal rods and domes similar to those of early stromatoporoids.

A more probable set of stromatoporoid ancestors evolved in the Ordovician. These forerunners or close relatives are grouped in the incertae sedis sponge order Pulchrilaminida. Pulchrilaminids existed from the late Tremadocian stage (near the end of the Early Ordovician) up to the early Darriwilian stage (about mid-way through the Middle Ordovician). They were low-profile hypercalcified sponges which were similar to stromatoporoids in many respects, with one key difference: pulchrilaminids had spine-like projections (probably homologous with spicules) between the laminae of the skeleton.

The first stromatoporoids to evolve belonged to the order Labechiida, which rapidly acquired worldwide diversity in the Middle Ordovician. The oldest reported labechiid species are from the Early Ordovician, but abrupt diversification was delayed until the mid-to-late Darriwilian stage, simultaneous with the disappearance of pulchrilaminids. Stromatoporoid 'reefs' are found in South China from the start of the Ordovician, though by the Middle Ordovician they expanded to the Chazy Group of eastern North America and the Machiakou Formation of North China.

=== Diversity through time ===
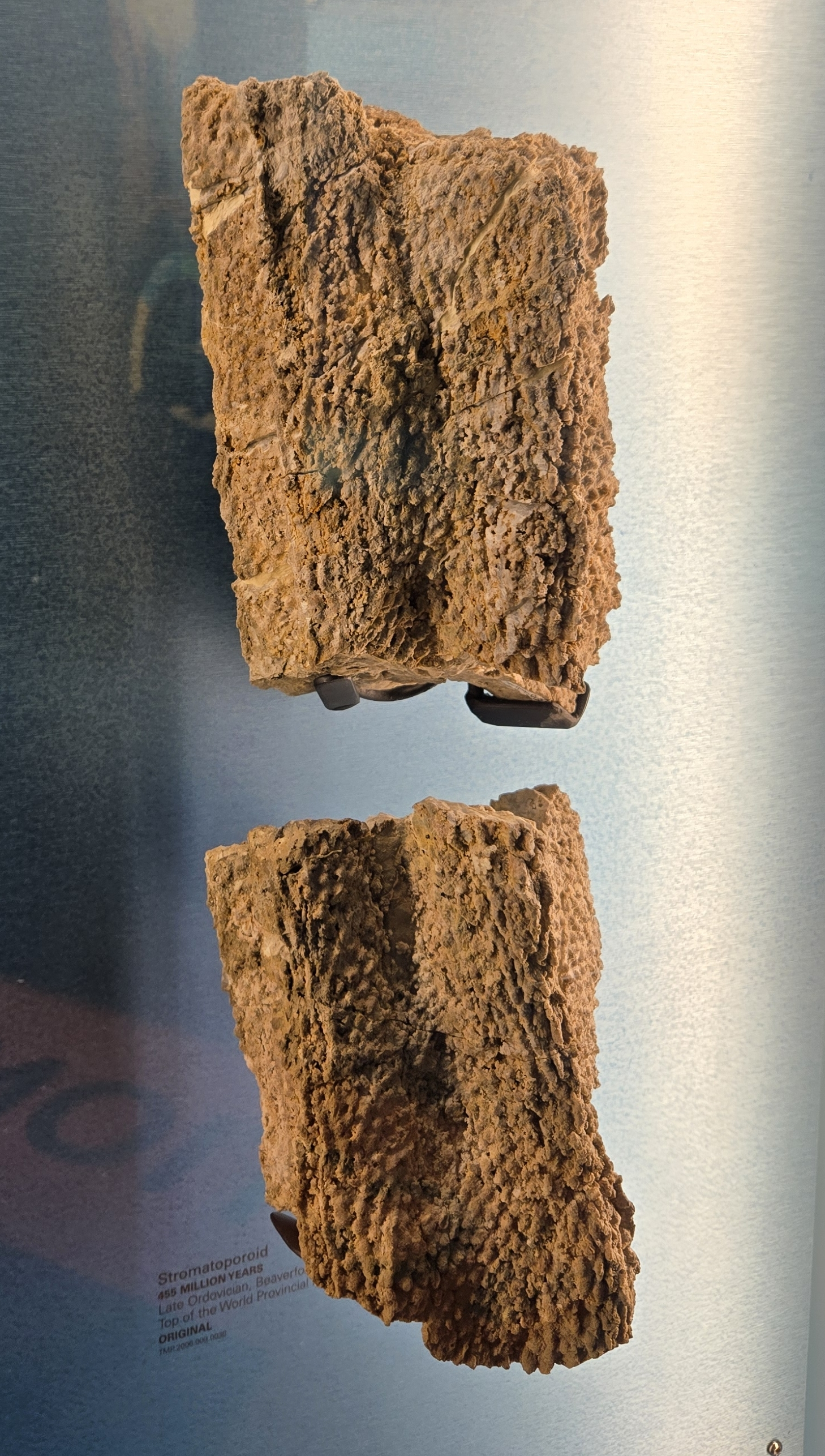
A partial fossil of Aulacera, a large column-shaped labechiid from Late Ordovician Canada.

Labechiids were by far the most diverse stromatoporoids of the Ordovician, and some paleontologists have even ventured to reconstruct lines of descent in this preliminary stage of stromatoporoid evolution. The next order to appear were the Clathrodictyida, in the early Katian stage of the Late Ordovician. It has been suggested that clathrodictyids are descended from labechiids, as part of an evolutionary lineage starting at the Siberian species Priscastroma gemini. Though less diverse than their labechiid relatives, Ordovician clathrodictyids were widespread and locally abundant in some areas. The third stromatoporoid order, Actinostromatida, may have originated in the Late Ordovician or the Llandovery Epoch (early Silurian). The precise timing depends on the status of Plumatalinia, a Late Ordovician Estonian genus often considered a 'missing link' between the ancestral labechiids and their presumed descendants, the actinostromatids.

Labechiid diversity contracted during the Late Ordovician mass extinction and throughout the Silurian, while clathrodictyids and actinostromatids diversified substantially. The other four stromatoporoid orders (Amphiporida, Stromatoporellida, Stromatoporida, and Syringostromatida) also originated in the Silurian, though they remained fairly subdued compared to the three older groups. Silurian stromatoporoids would face a second round of extinction in the late Silurian (Pridoli Epoch), which reduced the number of genera back to Middle Ordovician levels.

Stromatoporoids recovered strongly in the Early and Middle Devonian, reaching their overall maximum diversity in the Eifelian stage. Clathrodictyids, stromatoporellids, stromatoporids, and syringostromatids benefited the most from this renewal of biodiversity. The arrival of the Late Devonian disrupted this apex of stromatoporoid evolution. Syringostromatids were the first to be affected, virtually disappearing from the fossil record at the start of the Frasnian stage. Actinostromatids, stromatoporellids, and stromatoporids were next in line, with their diversity and reef extent collapsing at the end of the Frasnian in accordance with the Kellwasser event (Late Devonian mass extinction). Diversity loss prior to the Kellwasser event was likely a factor of both falling origination rates and slightly elevated extinction rates. Other groups presented unexpected patterns: the formerly rare amphiporids reached their highest diversity in the Frasnian, while labechiids staged a remarkable comeback in the Famennian stage, acquiring levels of diversity not seen since the Ordovician. This would not last, as stromatoporoids appear to have been completely extinguished during the Hangenberg event (end-Devonian mass extinction) at the end of the Famennian.

=== Post-Devonian identifications ===
Putative post-Devonian stromatoporoid fossils have been reported, though their referral to the group is rather ambiguous. A supposed labechiid species (Labechia carbonaria) is known from the Viséan stage of England. Some sources consider this species to be based on misinterpreted coral fragments, while others certify its legitimacy as a Carboniferous stromatoporoid. Fossils of the Ordovician labechiid Lophiostroma have been reported from sediments as young as the Triassic, but this is another case of poor preservation and uncertain identity. Finally, the calcitic sponge Kyklopora, from the Serpukhovian stage (upper Mississippian) of Russia, has tentatively been identified as a clathrodictyid. Labechiid-like fossils are abundant in early Pennsylvanian (Bashkirian) reef deposits of the Akiyoshi Limestone Group in Japan, representing a Panthalassan seamount.

Over 60 valid genera of small hypermineralized Mesozoic sponges have been described as stromatoporoids based on their anatomical similarity to stromatoporids, actinostromatids, clathrodictyids, or syringostromatids. One hypothesis suggests a direct line of descent between Paleozoic and Mesozoic forms. Under this interpretation, the Devonian extinctions merely prompted stromatoporoids to abandon mineralization until the Jurassic, explaining their lack of fossils between the two time intervals. Most paleontologists disagree with this idea, since Paleozoic and Mesozoic 'stromatoporoids' differ in several key aspects. In contrast to true Paleozoic stromatoporoids, Mesozoic species have recognizable spicules and a more complex microstructure within the laminae and pillars which make up the skeleton. Mesozoic 'stromatoporoids' are a polyphyletic group, with different species referable to the Demospongiae (demosponges) and Calcarea (calcareous sponges). Sponges in this category are understudied and many proposed genera have proven to be dubious.

== Paleoecology ==
=== Stromatoporoid reefs ===
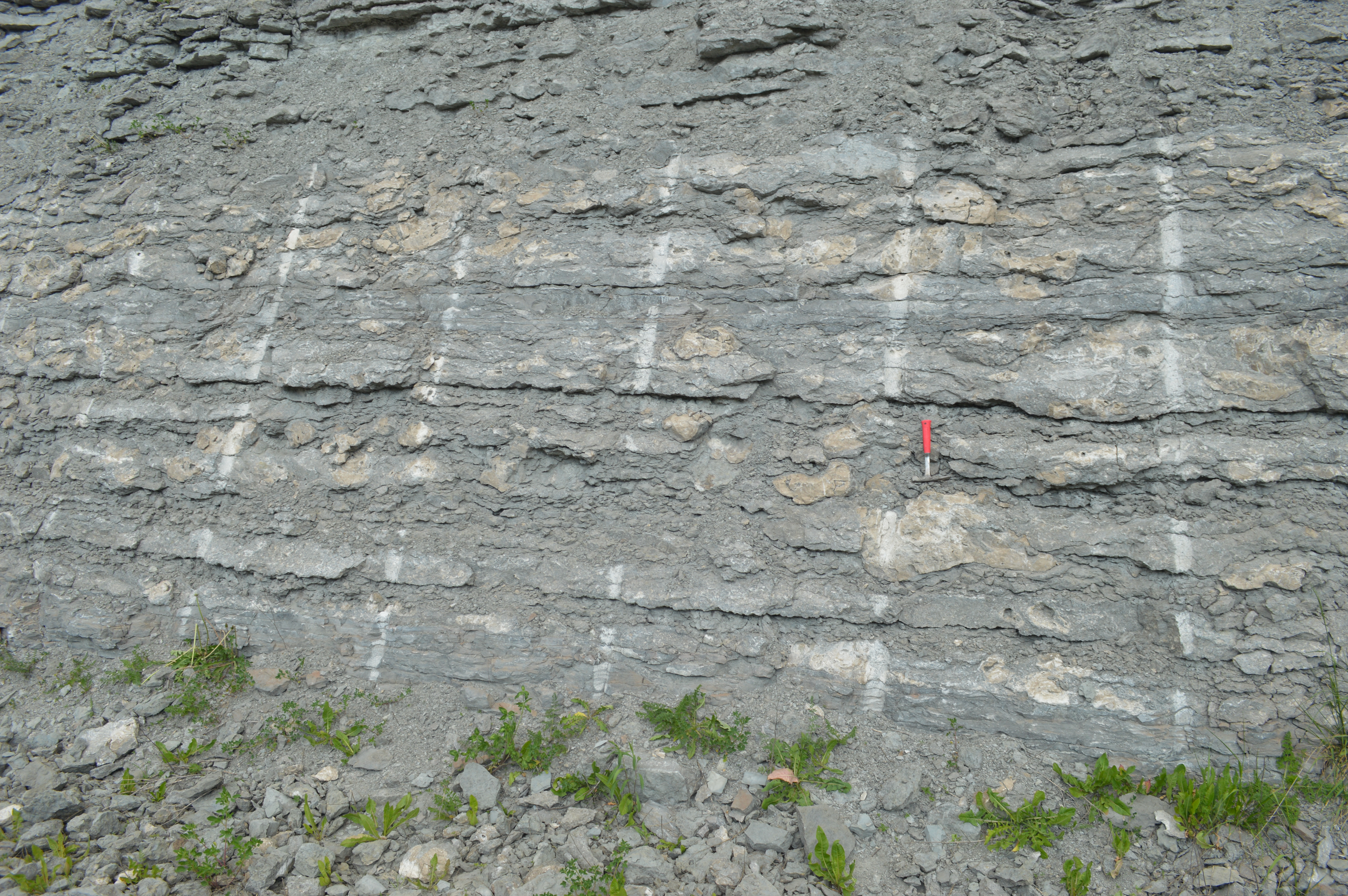
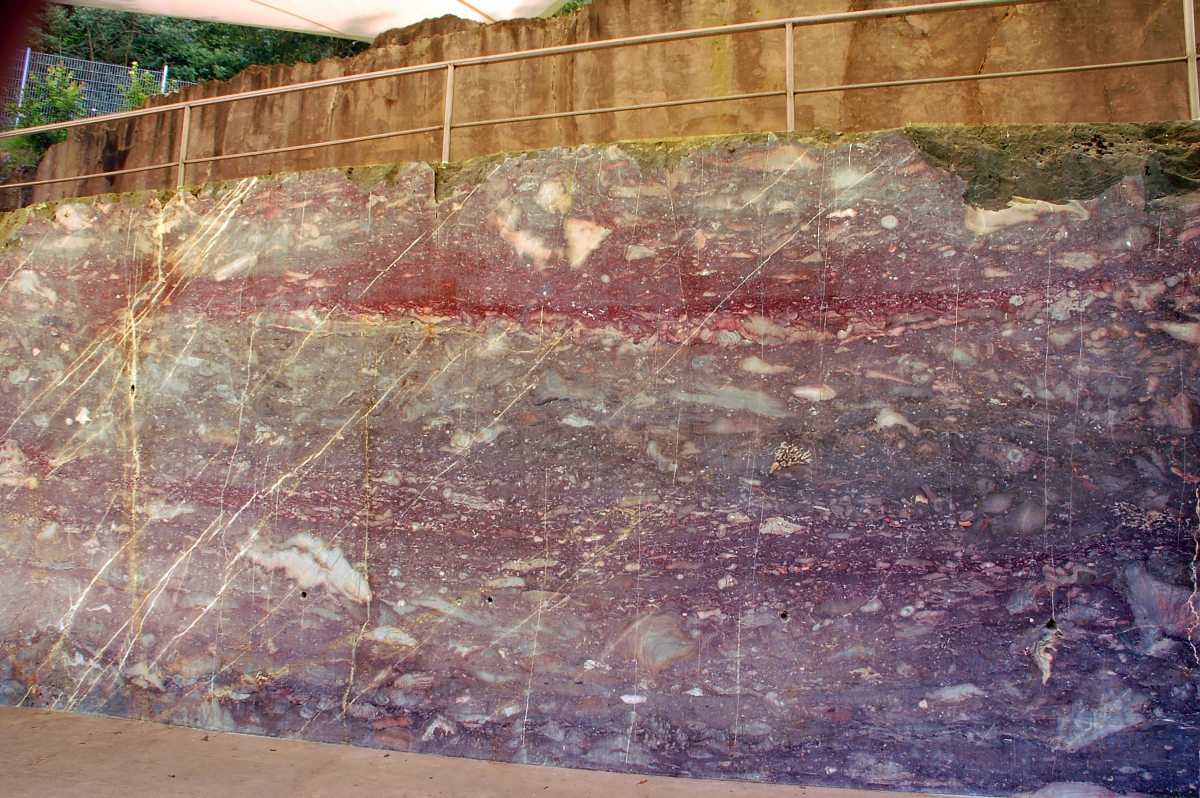
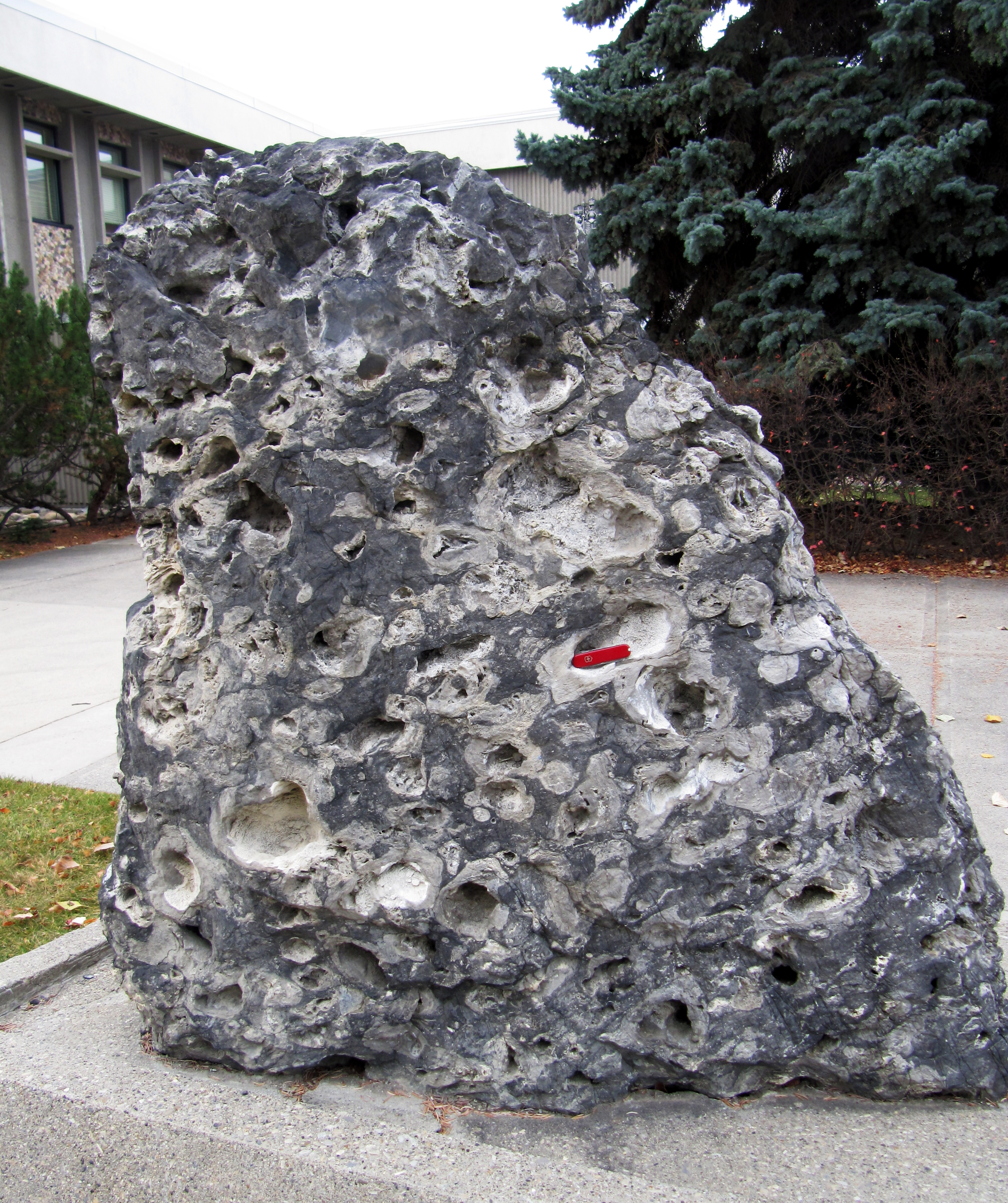
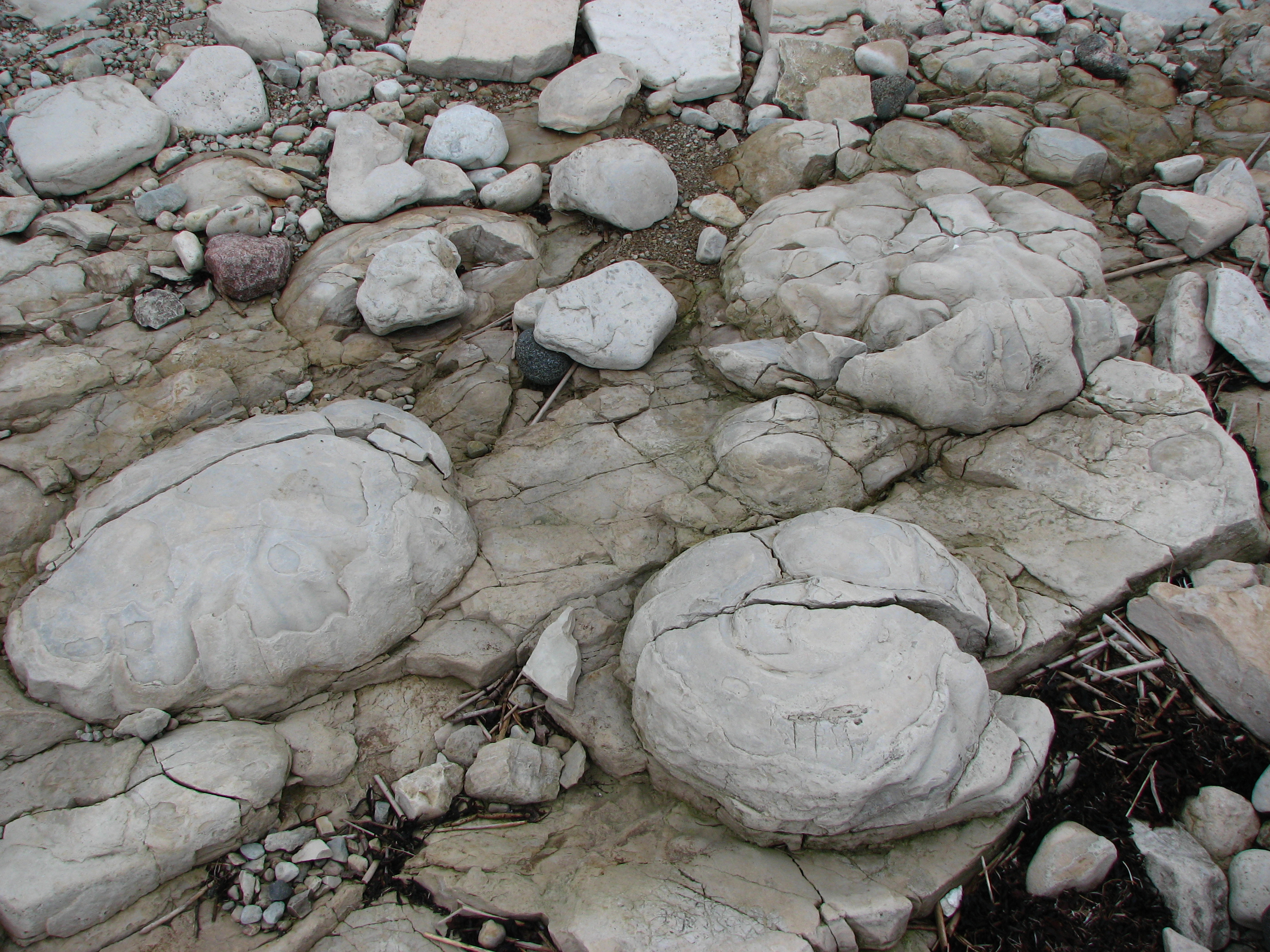
Dense stromatoporoid biostromes and other assemblages, from top left clockwise:
- Arnheim Formation (Ordovician, Ohio);
- 'Lahnmarmor' (Devonian, Germany);
- unspecified (unspecified, Estonia);
- Cairn Formation (Late Devonian, Alberta)

Like modern corals, stromatoporoids were gregarious filter feeders which congregated into closely packed patches. They were adaptable and could thrive at a variety of depths, light levels, and fluctuating sea level regimes. In these regards, they were more similar to corals than to modern calcareous sponges, which generally occupy a narrow selection of rocky habitats with high nutrient supply and low light levels.

Unlike corals, stromatoporoids usually settled on soft substrates, so their 'reefs' occupied only a single level rather than a multi-tiered vertical framework of built-up skeletons. Flat, horizontally-extensive 'reefs' are formally known as biostromes. Stromatoporoid reefs had fairly low diversity, with only a few species making up the majority of an assemblage by volume. The most diverse stromatoporoid assemblages were biostromes on carbonate platforms at intermediate depths, away from muddier basins or saltier shallows. The predominant species were usually laminar or low domical in form. High domical species and other complex forms only developed in calmer settings, where there is little risk of toppling. In a stable environment, stromatoporoids could grow to very large sizes exceeding several meters in width or height. The largest singular stromatoporoid fossil ever reported is a 30-meter (98 feet) wide Actinostroma expansum from the Frasnian-age Shell Rock Formation of Iowa.

Despite their preference for soft flat sediment, stromatoporoids occasionally contributed to built-up skeletal mounds (bioherms) with successive waves of burial and recolonization or regrowth. Shelf-margin stromatoporoid bioherms are particularly well-developed in the Devonian. Notable examples can be found in the Canning Basin of Australia, the Miette Complex of Alberta, the Eifel Region of Germany, and southern Belgium. Raised bioherms would have been strengthened by microbial carbonate and other reef-building organisms living between the sponges.

=== Ectosymbionts and encrusters ===
As hard sessile objects, stromatoporoids were used as a substrate for ectosymbionts, organisms which attach or encrust onto the outer surface of the skeleton. Most encrusting organisms were cryptobionts, meaning that they inhabited shaded spaces and cavities. These hidden areas could be found in gaps between the base of the stromatoporoid and its substrate, or on the underside of shelf-like projections. Displaced or toppled sponges had the potential to host cryptic encrusters on any part of the skeleton. Bryozoans, tabulate corals, crinoids, brachiopods, and clusters of coiled 'spirorbids' all occupied the cryptic niche. The rim of the hidden areas hosted the greatest diversity of encrusters, most of which were filter feeders reliant on a current to feed. More exposed areas were also encrusted by corals (both tabulate and rugose), crinoids, bryozoans, and tentaculitids.

=== Endosymbionts ===
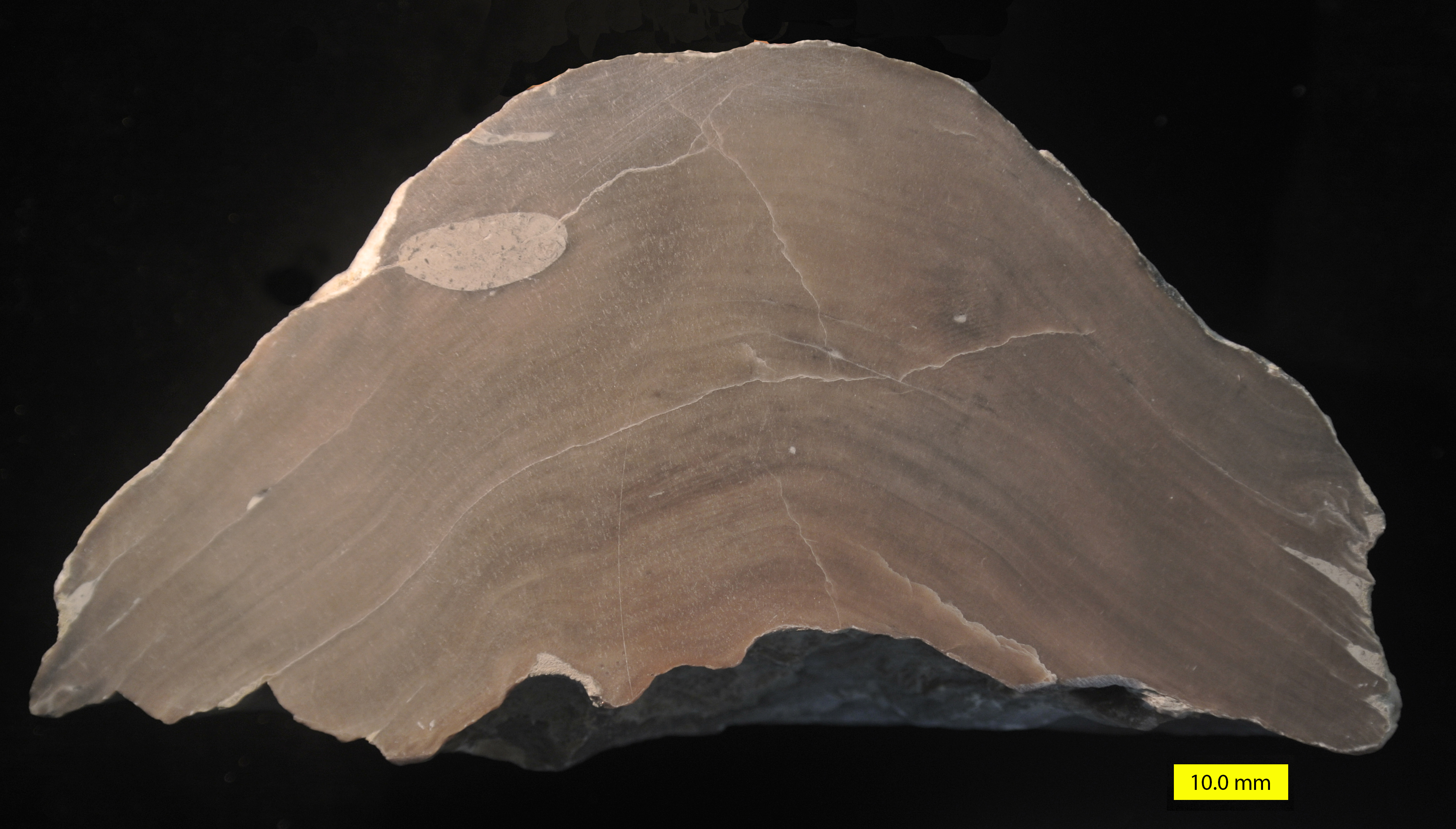
A vertical cross-section of Densastroma pexisum, a domical stromatoporoid in the order Actinostromatida. An endosymbiotic boring (Osprioneides) is visible at the top left. From the Silurian of Saaremaa Island, Estonia.

Like many modern or prehistoric reef-builders, stromatoporoids were host to endosymbionts, organisms living fully within the skeleton. The most abundant were syringoporids, a type of tube-building tabulate coral. Stromatoporoid fossils with syringoporid burrows are so common that some historical sources have misclassified them as a distinct genus, Caunopora. Syringoporids were able to grow at the same rate as their host in order to prevent being overgrown. Other tabulate corals, rugosan corals, and algal fossils have been found wedged between growth zones within the stromatoporoid skeleton. Worm borings such as Trypanites are also common endosymbionts, though they apparently only took root in the skeleton after the sponge had died.

A persistent question for stromatoporoid ecology is how they were able to compete with corals in shallow, brightly lit areas. One hypothesis is that heavy laminar growth forms were more resistant to damage from waves and storms, yet laminar stromatoporoids were equally common in deep or undisturbed waters. Another hypothesis argues that stromatoporoids benefited from a mutualistic (mutually beneficial) relationship with endosymbiotic microbes. Modern scleractinian corals are mixotrophs, deriving energy from both tiny prey items and zooxanthellae, photosynthetic algae which live within their cells. Zooxanthellae additionally assist the corals' biochemical processes, allowing for expeditious growth rates. No equivalent organisms are known in modern sponges, though some demosponges do host a high volume of cyanobacteria within their skeletons.

Several lines of evidence suggest a mixotrophic lifestyle for stromatoporoids, though none are unambiguous. Their ratios of oxygen and carbon isotopes overlap with corals to an extent. If one assumes that latilaminae (growth interruptions parallel to laminae) are annual (like tree rings), stromatoporoid growth rates can reach 2 to 10 mm per year, equivalent to corals and much higher than modern calcareous sponges. On the other hand, most stromatoporoid growth forms emphasized stability and horizontal breadth rather than a vertical 'race for sunlight', as exhibited by sessile organisms which rely on photosynthesis, such as land plants and corals.

== Gallery ==
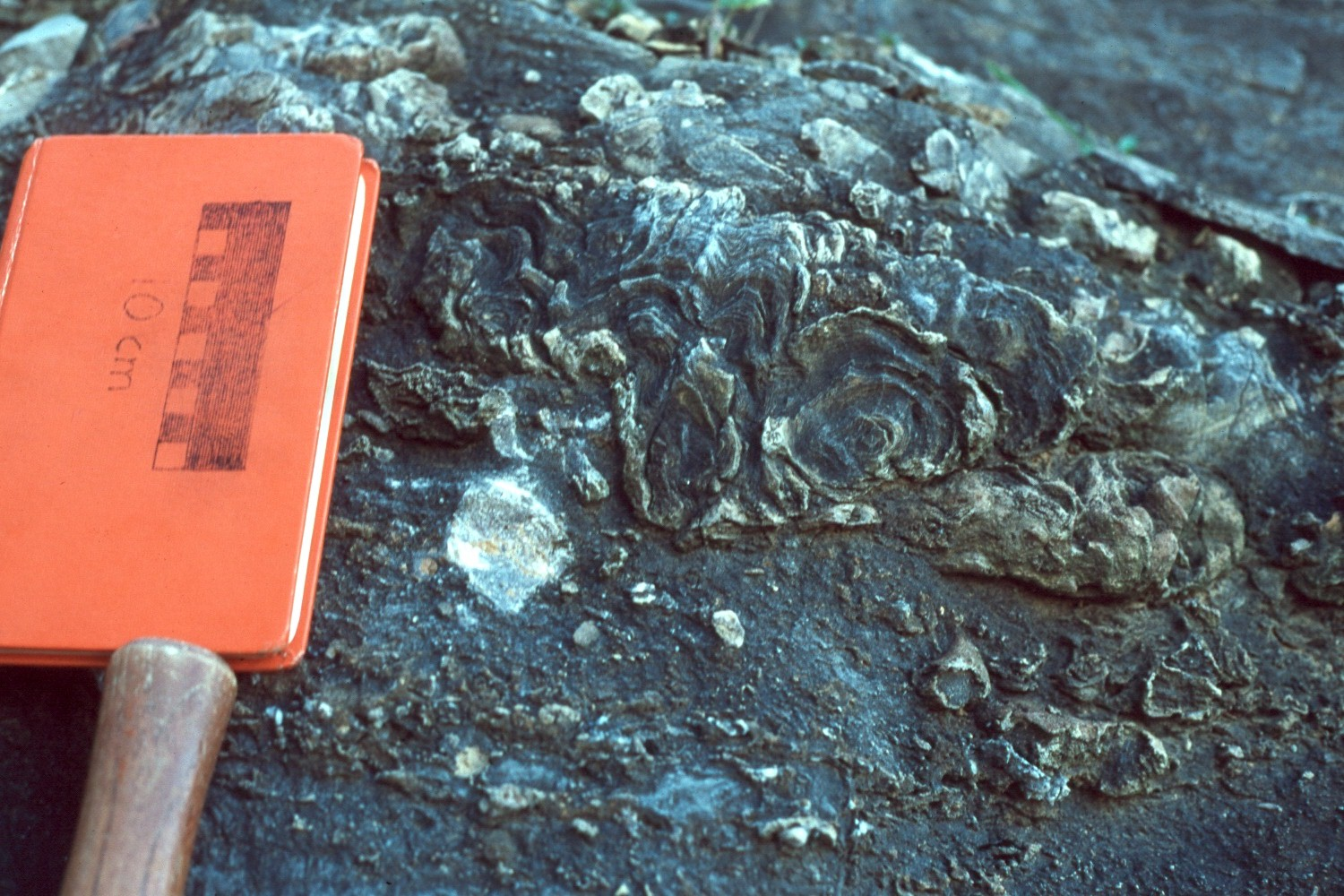
Stromatoporoids exposed from below on an outcrop. From the Keyser Formation (Pridoli – Lower Devonian) of Pennsylvania

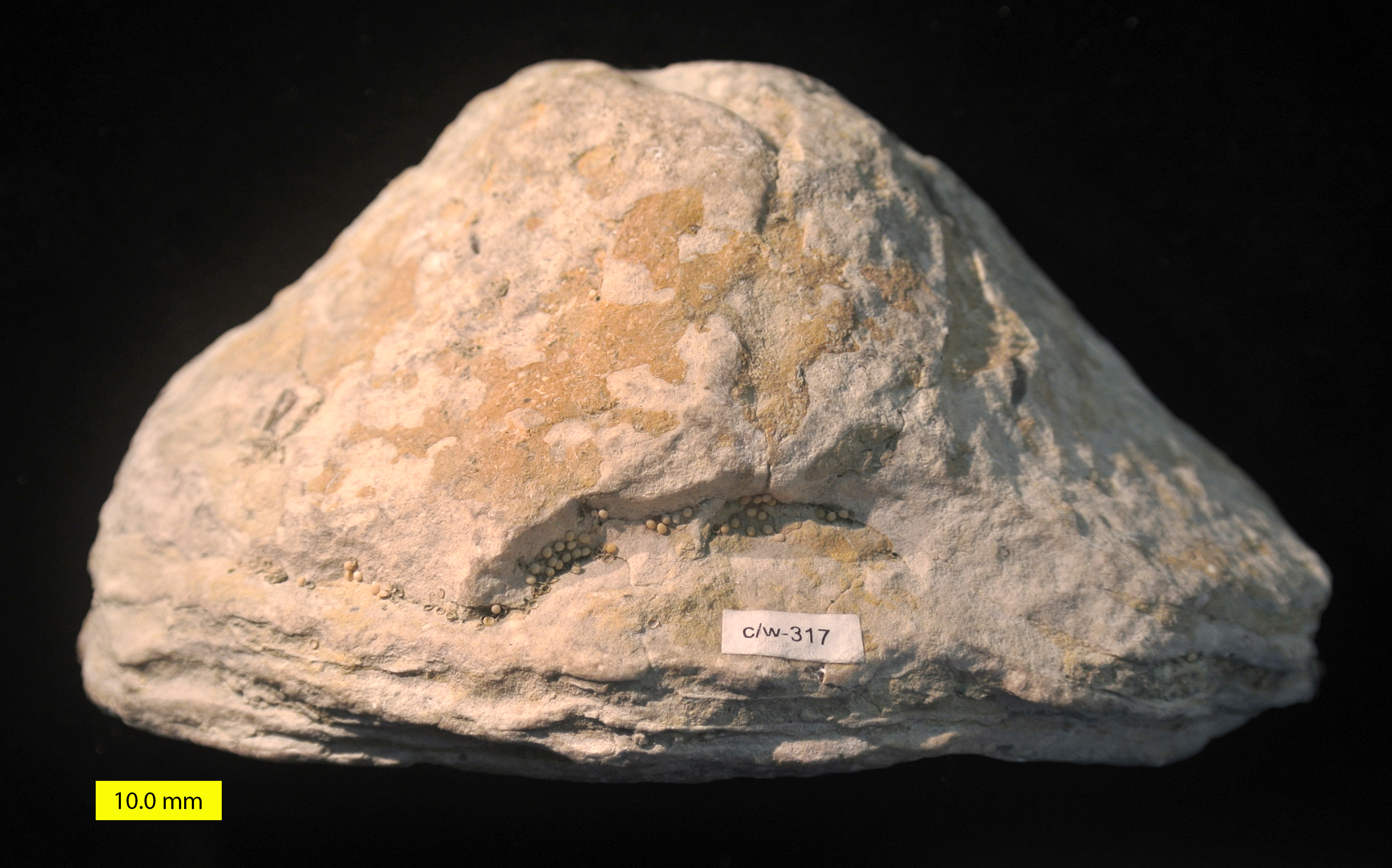
Densastroma pexisum, as seen externally. From the Silurian of Saaremaa Island, Estonia.

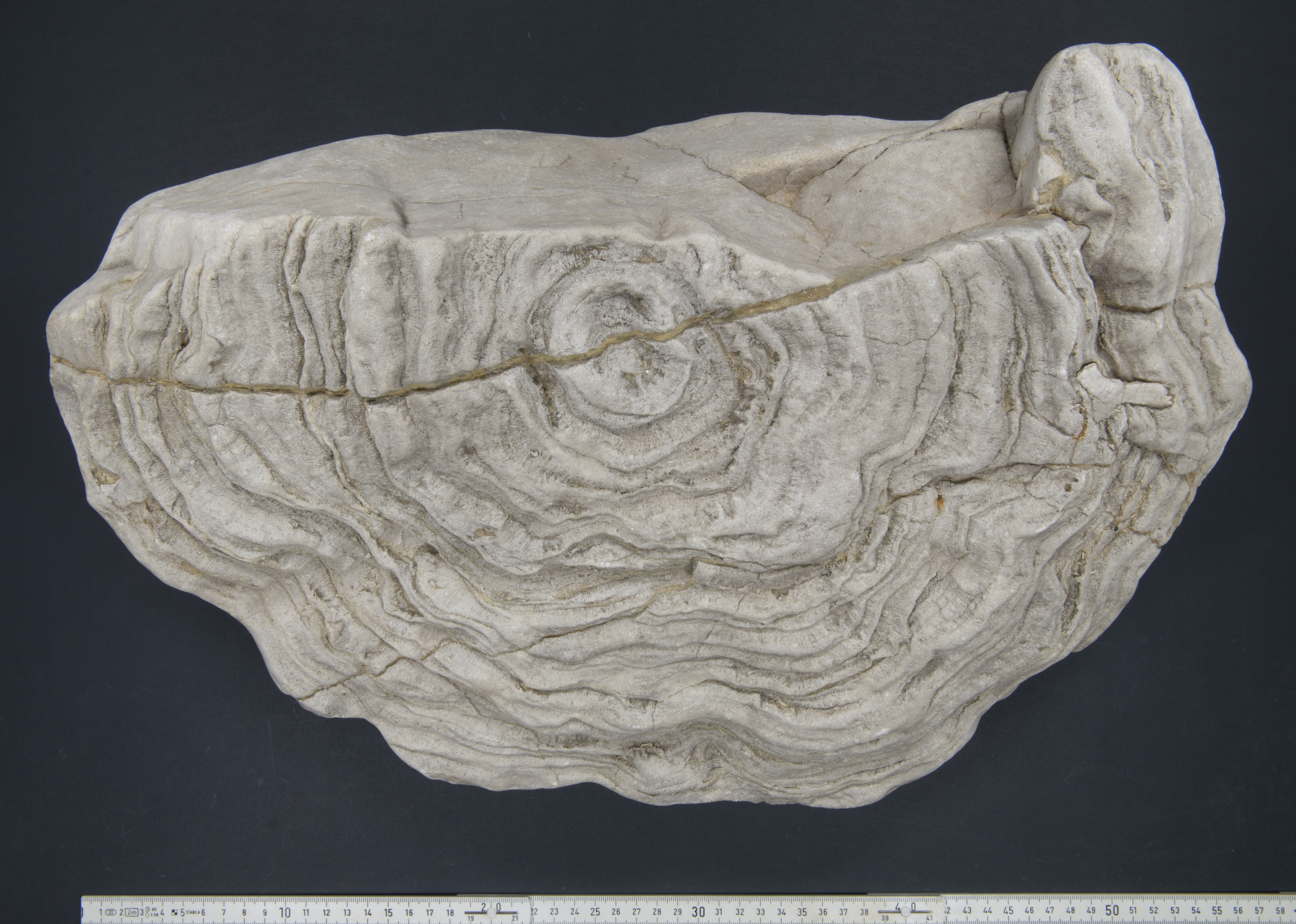
A stromatoporoid as seen from below, showing the basal layer. From Gotland, Sweden

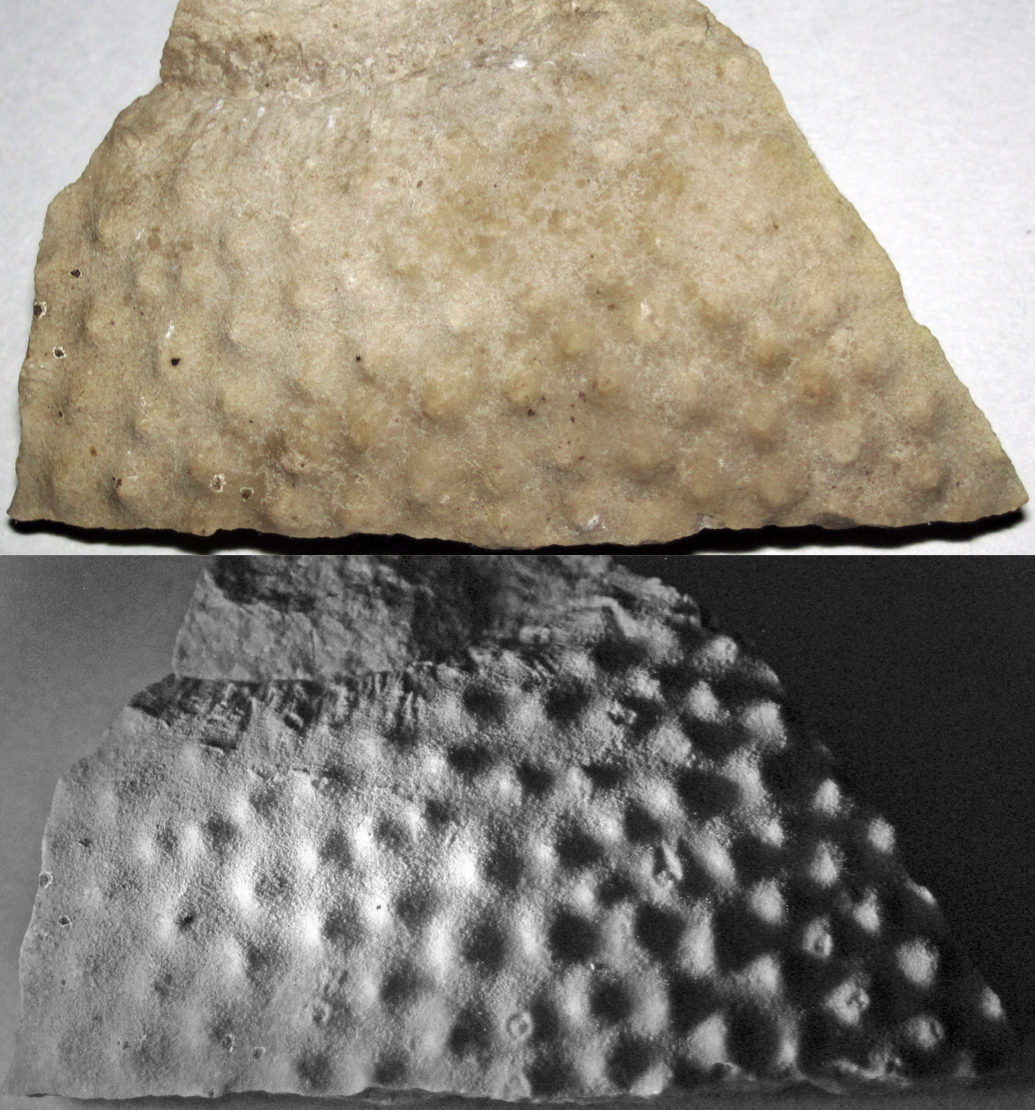
A stromatoporoid with prominent mamelons. From the Traverse Group (Middle Devonian) of Michigan

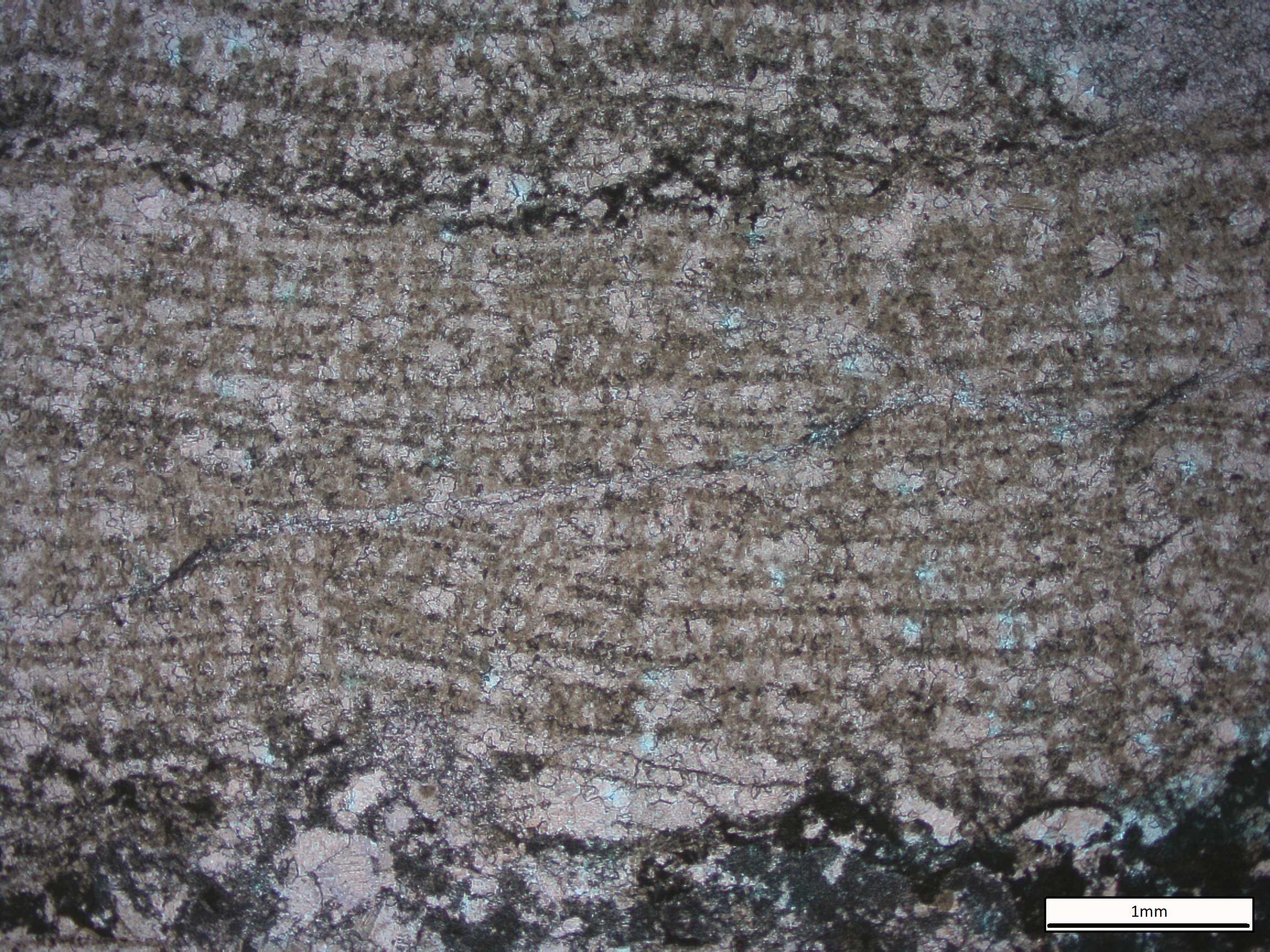
A magnified cross-section of a stromatoporoid, showing internal laminae, pillars, and galleries. From the Jefferson Formation (Devonian) of Montana
