= Clearwater River (Saskatchewan) =

River in Western Canada

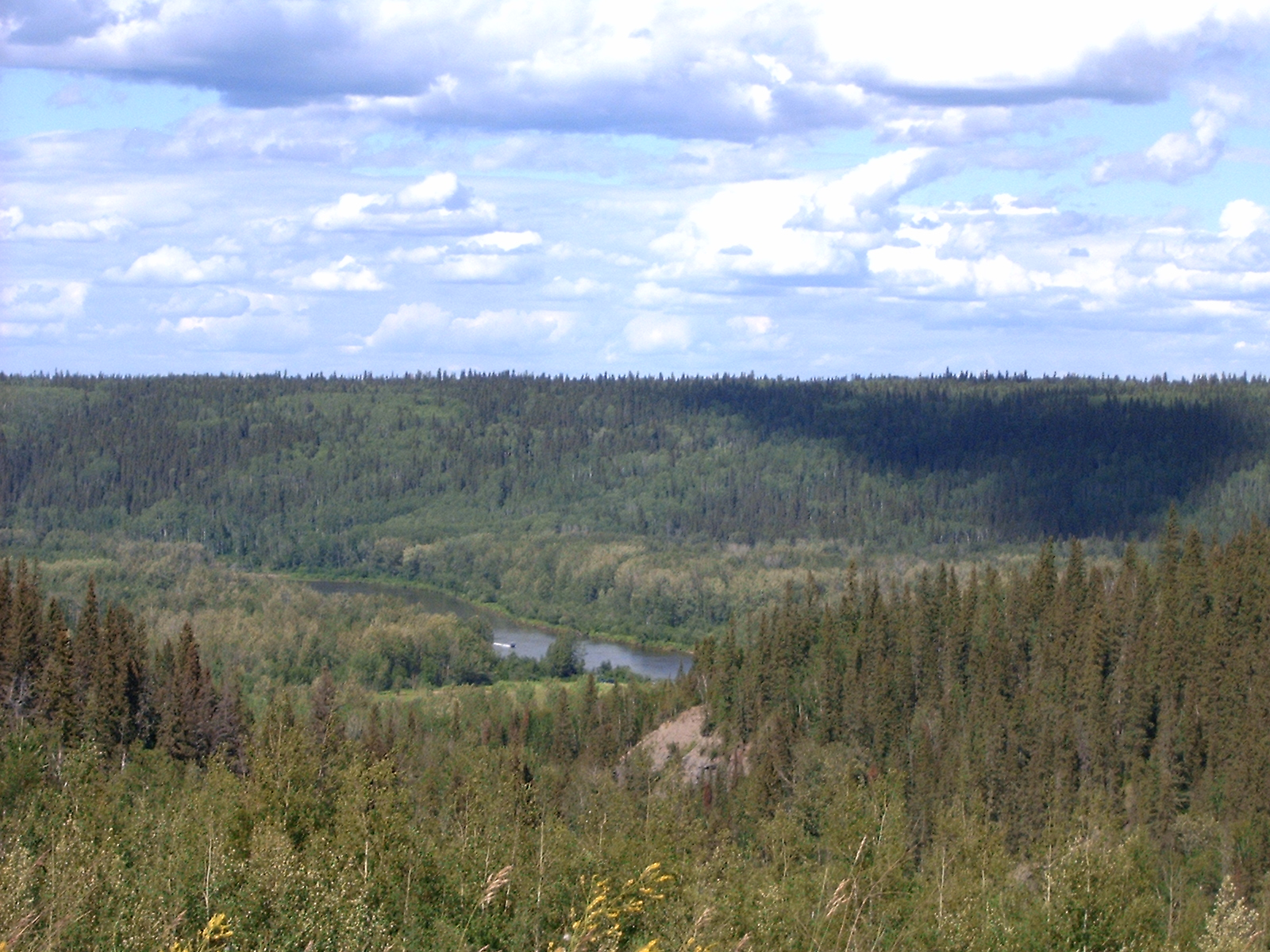
- Clearwater River valley near Fort McMurray

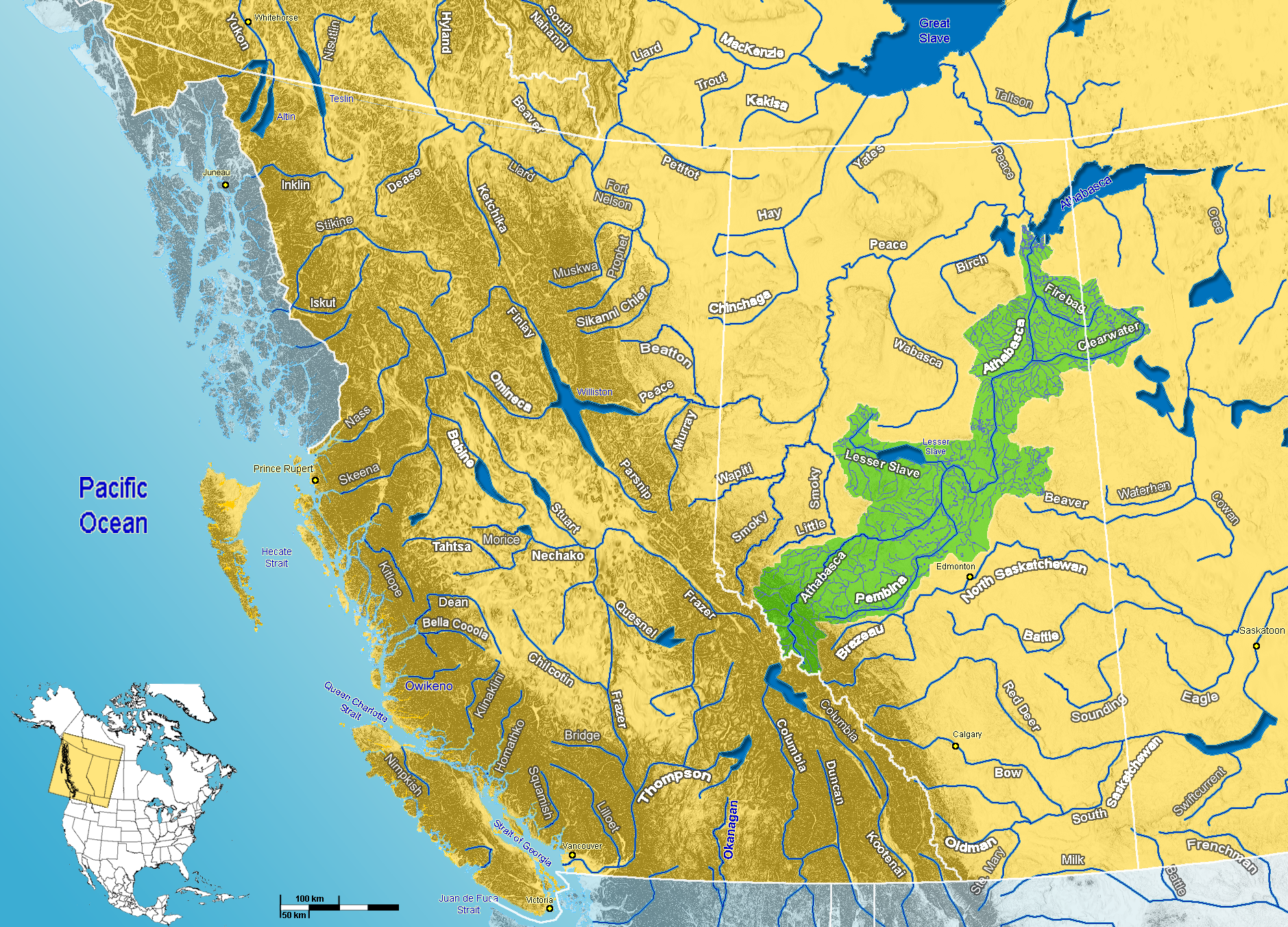
- Clearwater River is at red pin

- Location of the mouth of the river in Alberta

Location
- Country: Canada
- Provinces: Saskatchewan; Alberta

Physical characteristics
- Source: Broach Lake
  - location: Saskatchewan
  - coordinates: 57°43′14″N 109°22′30″W
- Mouth: Athabasca River at
  - location: Fort McMurray, Alberta
  - coordinates: 56°44′53″N 111°23′1.4″W
- Length: 295 km (183 mi)

Basin features
- River system: Athabasca River
- Waterfalls: Smoothrock Falls

The Clearwater River is located in the Canadian provinces of Saskatchewan and Alberta. It rises in the northern forest region of north-western Saskatchewan and joins the Athabasca River in north-eastern Alberta. It was part of an important trade route during the fur trade era and has been designated as a Canadian Heritage River.

== Course ==
The Clearwater River has a total length of 295 kilometres (183 mi). It flows south-eastward from its headwaters at Broach Lake and turns to the south-west from Careen Lake to the Alberta / Saskatchewan border. From there it flows westward for a distance of 108 kilometres (67 mi) to join the Athabasca River at Fort McMurray. The section of the river in Fort McMurray is referred to as the Chant.

From Broach Lake at an elevation of 460 metres (1,510 ft) above sea level, the Clearwater drops about 150 metres (490 ft) to the confluence at Fort McMurray. Its waters eventually reach the Arctic Ocean via the Athabasca and Mackenzie Rivers. Tributaries of the Clearwater River include Descharme River and McLean River in Saskatchewan and the Christina River in Alberta.

== Geology ==
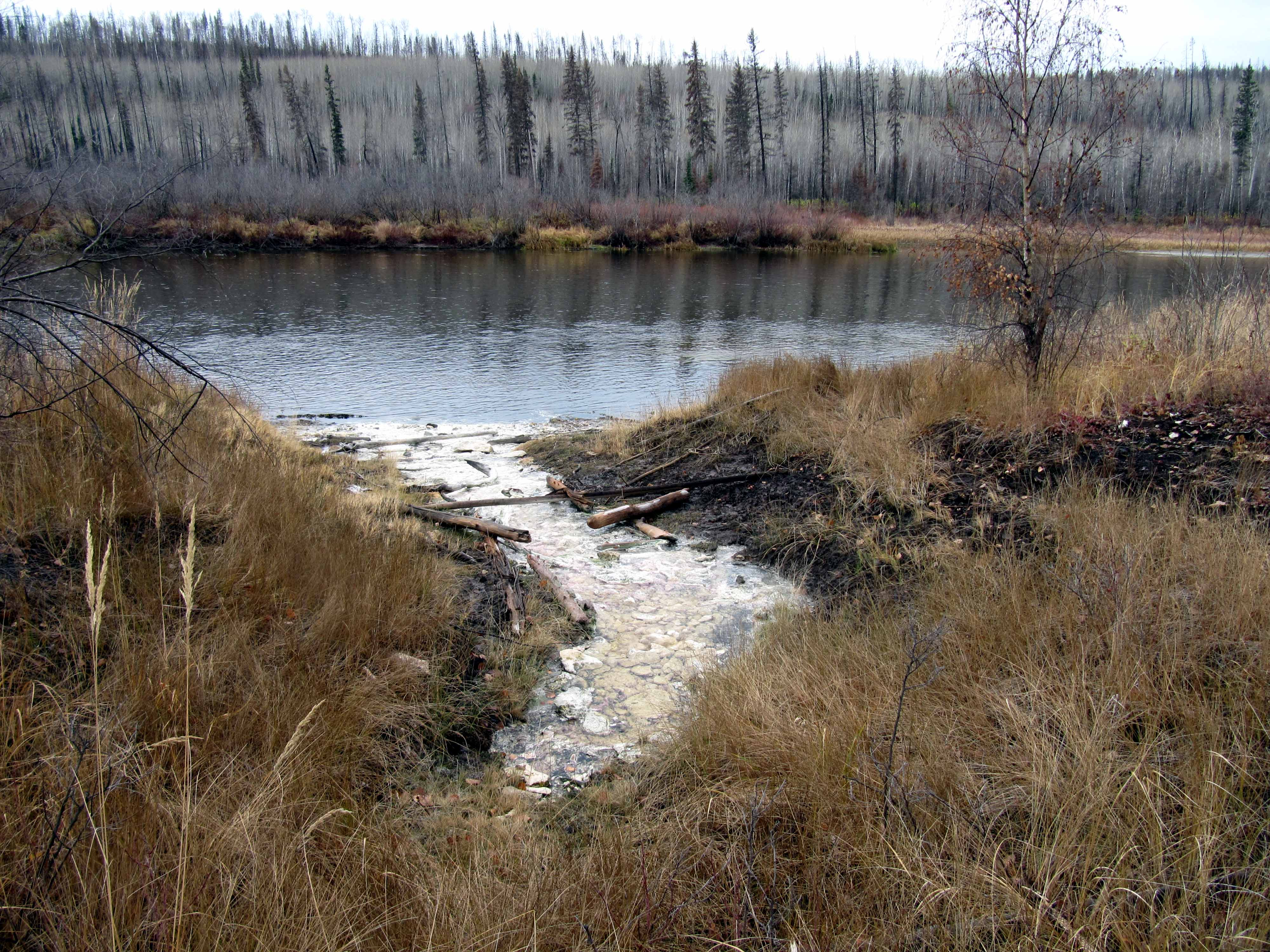
A salt spring discharges into the Clearwater River in northeastern Alberta.

In its upper reaches, the Clearwater River flows over the Precambrian rocks of the Canadian Shield. That section of the river is rough, characterized by rapids, small waterfalls, and a gorge. The river leaves the Shield near the Alberta border and enters the Interior Plains where it becomes meandering, with numerous sand bars and small islands. There it is flanked by outcrops of the Devonian limestones, dolomite, and shales of the La Loche, Contact Rapids, Keg River, and Waterways Formations, as well as the Cretaceous oil sands of the McMurray Formation.

The Clearwater River is an underfit stream; that is, its present flow is insufficient to have carved its broad, steep-sided valley. Instead, its morphology may be the result of catastrophic paleoflooding that originated from Glacial Lake Agassiz during late Pleistocene time and flowed through the Clearwater and Athabasca river valleys on its way to the Arctic Ocean. The channel cut by that flood is known as the Clearwater Spillway.

There are several salt springs and saline marshes that discharge into the Clearwater River in northeastern Alberta. The water, which comes from the underlying Devonian rock formations, is effervescent in places and smells of sulfur.

== History ==
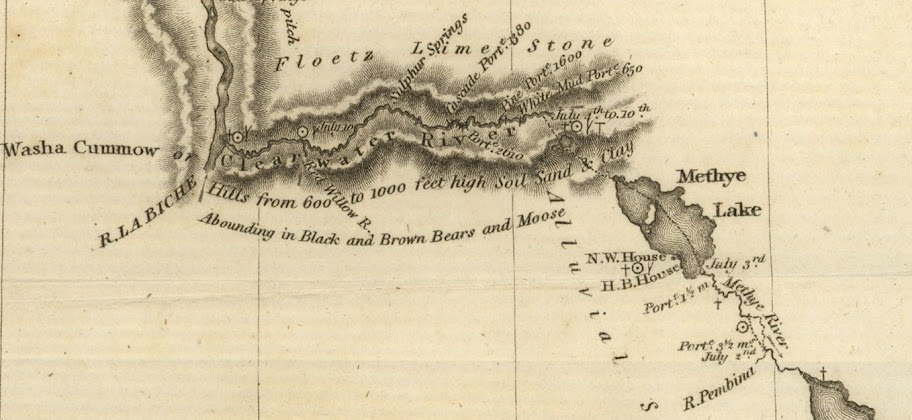
A section of John Franklin's 1819-20 expedition map showing the Clearwater River fur trade route from Methye Portage to Fort McMurray

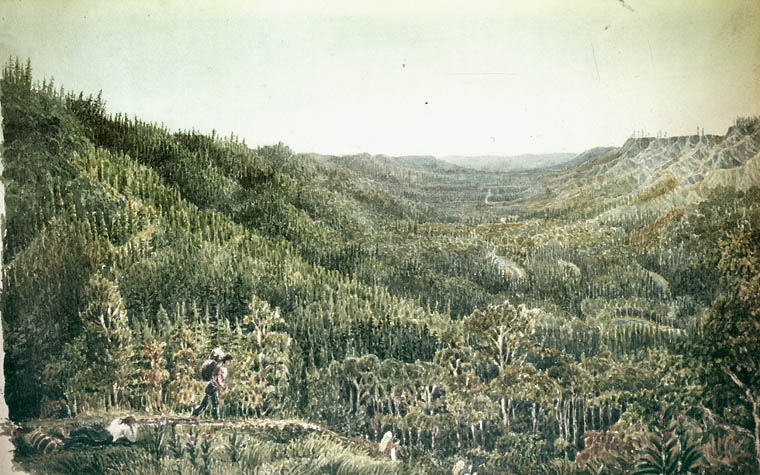
The Clearwater River valley from Methye Portage by George Back in 1825

Rock-paintings along the upper portion of the river, shapes and symbols on rock surfaces, suggest that the area was already inhabited 5,000 years ago. Before the European colonisation, native groups of Beaver, Chipewyan, and Cree people lived in the Clearwater River area.

During European exploration and the fur trade of the 18th century, the lower Clearwater River was part of an important canoe route between Hudson Bay and Montreal in the east, and the District of Athabasca in the west. The rough Precambrian upper portion of the Clearwater River was a barrier to the traders until 1778, when explorer Peter Pond crossed the Methye Portage to bypass it. Methye Portage extended between Lac La Loche and the Clearwater River, forming a 19-kilometre (12 mi) overland link on the route from Churchill, Manitoba to Athabasca, Alberta. For almost 40 years, this was the only overland connection for the fur trade in the region, and it continued in use for most of the 19th century.

== Fish species ==
The river's fish species include: walleye, yellow perch, northern pike, lake trout, Arctic grayling, lake whitefish, cisco, white sucker, longnose sucker and burbot.

== Conservation ==
=== Provincial park ===
The province of Saskatchewan has established the Clearwater River Provincial Park, encompassing an area of 865 mi^{2}; or 2240 km^{2}, to protect the river's environment.

=== Canadian Heritage Rivers System ===
The Saskatchewan section was granted Canadian Heritage River status because of its "unspoiled, clear-water river in a pristine" isolated "wilderness setting of spectacular beauty".

== Regional Aquatics Monitoring Program (RAMP) ==
The Regional Aquatics Monitoring Program (RAMP) uses the Clearwater River as a "baseline river system" to provide "information on the variability and characteristics of natural systems". Although natural outcrops of McMurray Formation oil sands are present along the river, the "lack of significant oil sands developments" within its watershed allows it to be used as a baseline.

== See also ==
- List of rivers of Alberta
- List of rivers of Saskatchewan
- Athabasca oil sands
