= Paleoflooding =

Paleoflooding refers to any flooding event that took place in pre-history, physical evidence of which exists in Earth's geologic record. The phenomenon is apparent over various spatial and temporal scales. It often occurred on a large scale, and was the result of either glacial ice melt causing large outbursts of freshwater, or high sea levels breaching bodies of freshwater. If a freshwater outflow event was large enough that the water reached the ocean system, it caused changes in salinity that potentially affected ocean circulation and global climate. Freshwater flows could also accumulate to form continental glacial lakes, and this is another indicator of large-scale flooding. In contrast, periods of high global sea level (often during interglacials) could cause marine water to breach natural dams and flow into bodies of freshwater. Changes in salinity of freshwater and marine bodies can be detected from the analysis of organisms that inhabited those bodies at a given time, as certain organisms are more suited to live in either fresh or saline conditions.

== Paleoflooding resulting from glacial melt ==
=== Champlain Sea ===
The Champlain Sea was a body of salt water that underwent several episodes of freshening. Two main events were observed 11.4 and 13.0 ka BP (thousand years Before Present). Faunal and foraminifera indicators in core samples taken from the sea can be used to estimate its salinity throughout time. The ages of various portions and depths of core samples are determined through radiocarbon dating.

The Champlain Sea was located to the north of present-day New York and Vermont, on the southern fringes of Quebec and was open to the Northern Atlantic Ocean on its northeast arm. During the last deglaciation as the Laurentide Ice Sheet retreated, two major glacial lakes formed to the west of the Champlain Sea – Lake Agassiz and Lake Algonquin (Fig. 1). As these lakes continued to expand, freshwater flooded eastward toward and into the Champlain Sea. However, uncertainty still exists regarding the location of the drainage and its exact effects on ocean salinity. Because of the Champlain Sea's openness to the Atlantic Ocean, changes in the salinity of the Champlain Sea could have translated into the Northern Atlantic, thus possibly causing changes in ocean circulation and climate. In fact, the melting of the Laurentide Ice Sheet was so extensive that its melt water entered the Gulf of Mexico, Arctic Ocean, and Hudson Bay (Fig. 2) in addition to the Champlain Sea and the Atlantic Ocean.

Terrestrial plant material, seeds, and marine shells from Champlain Sea core samples have been used as proxies for paleosalinity. By studying δ^{13}C (change in carbon-13) of marine mollusks, it can be inferred that when they existed in the Champlain Sea, conditions were brackish (mixture of fresh and salt water) about 10.8 ka BP. The δ^{13}C value of a core sample Melo-1 (see Fig. 3 for location) indicates the amount of light carbon that is present. Biota preferentially intake light carbon, so the more that is present in a sample, the more biota that was present at that time. Additionally, core samples from the Champlain Sea indicate a change in assemblages from those that inhabit marine environments to those that live in much less saline conditions at about 11.4 to 11.2 ka BP (Fig. 4). In the specific core sample (core Melo-5, location noted in Fig. 3) analysis shown in Fig. 4, there is a change in assemblages from almost 100% E. clavata (which inhabits marine environments) to >50% E. albiumbilicatum (which prefers less saline conditions)—both species of Elphidium. This transition seems to be probable, as it has been corroborated by multiple studies. The overall decrease in salinity has been estimated to be from 25 psu to less than 15 psu (practical salinity units). The decrease in salinity starting at Melo-1 and moving to Melo-5 indicates a downstream translation of freshening.

== Climate change due to large-scale paleoflooding ==
During the period of the melting of the Laurentide Ice Sheet, three of the largest periods of Northern Hemisphere cooling occurred directly following large freshwater fluxes from Lake Agassiz. At the time, Lake Agassiz was the largest lake in North America, and it intermittently expelled massive volumes of water. For perspective, it periodically covered over one million km^{2}, and was often larger than 150,000 km^{2} over its 4000-year history. If the flux of freshwater into the open ocean was great enough, it could have had a large effect on the formation of North Atlantic Deep Water. That is to say, North Atlantic Deep Water formation could have periodically completely ceased, and the thermohaline circulation could have shut down. Basically, the thermohaline circulation refers to the circulation resulting from differences in ocean temperature and salinity. For example, a large portion of deep water is created in the Arctic as surface water adjacent to glaciers that is more dense than surrounding water (because it is influenced by recent cold melt water, cooled by evaporation from surface winds, and is saline) sinks to the deep ocean. However, if a large enough quantity of this water becomes less saline, deep ocean formation would be primarily through thermal differences, which tend to be less dominant than with the added effects of salinity.

Before a determination of the effects of freshwater fluxes from Lake Agassiz on global ocean circulation and climate can be made, it is important to establish its baseline flux value. This is essentially a natural background flux of water from the lake. From 21.4 – 9.5 ka calendar years, this baseline flux for Lake Agassiz has been found to be about 0.3 to 0.4 Sverdrup, or Sv, in total (1 Sv = 1 x 106 m^{3} s^{−1}). This value was calculated using hydrological numerical model simulations and accounts for melt water and precipitation runoff. In reality, it is understood that this value is variable, so freshwater fluxes into the open ocean and their effect on thermohaline circulation, ocean circulations, and global climate would vary as well.

Considering the enormity of Lake Agassiz, changes in the make-up of its shores (beaches, cliffs), or strandlines, could result in very massive outflows. These changes were often sudden, causing thousands of cubic kilometers of water to exit via the newly created outflow channels, eventually making its way to the open ocean through one of four major routes. These routes have been identified to be the Mississippi River Valley, the St. Lawrence River Valley, the Mackenzie River Valley, and the Hudson Strait (Fig. 2). It is thought that these outflow events, leading to the drawdown of Lake Agassiz, could have lasted as little as a few months to a few years. The implication of this is that the rate of outflow would have been extremely high, especially in comparison to values that have been found to be necessary for disruptions of the thermohaline circulation (~1 Sv over ten years, or 0.1 Sv over about a century).

=== Major outbursts of Lake Agassiz followed by cooling events ===
==== Final drawdown resulting in the largest outburst ====
The greatest outburst of Lake Agassiz happened to be its last drawdown, occurring about 8.4 ka calendar years when it had joined glacial Lake Ojibway. Lake Ojibway was located on the Laurentide Ice Sheet margin in the southeastern portion of the Hudson Bay basin. The total surface area of the merged lake was approximately 841,000 km^{2}. The outburst was caused by a breach in the ice sheet over the Hudson Bay, and it is estimated that if this lake was completely drawn down from its maximum depth, about 163,000 km^{3} of water would be released into the North Atlantic Ocean in a very short period of time. Given the fact that the outflow channel for this case was not nearly as narrow as in other outbursts, it is likely that the lake indeed drew down very rapidly. If the outburst occurred in one year, the flux is estimated to be 5.2 Sv.

An alternative to the scenario of the Lake Agassiz outburst describes an initial outburst from the western portion of the lake, instead of the single outburst on its eastern edge as detailed above. In this case, it is hypothesized that a part of the Laurentide Ice Sheet might have remained over western Agassiz that prevented total drainage during the first episode to the east. Approximately 113,000 km^{3} was expelled initially to the east, resulting in a flux of 3.6 Sv (if it occurred in one year). When the western portion of Lake Agassiz drained a short time later, a flux of 1.6 Sv (again occurring over one year) would have resulted.

==== Other outbursts ====
Prior to its final drawdown, the first major outburst of Lake Agassiz occurred around 12.9 ka calendar years and involved the routing of water east into the Great Lakes and the St. Lawrence. Assuming this occurred over a one-year period, the flux was 0.30 Sv. Then, another outburst took place around 11.7 ka calendar years and contained two events total. First, water flooded southward through the Mississippi River Valley and into the Gulf of Mexico. Within a few years, flood water flowed to the northwest and into the Arctic Ocean. These two stages resulted in a total flux of 0.29 Sv (again, over one year). The fourth major flooding event that preceded a cooling period occurred about 11.2 ka calendar years. In this event, water flowed to the south and then the northwest, resulting in a flux of 0.19 Sv over one year. This event probably would have spanned more than a year, reducing the estimated flux, because of erosion to outflow channels due to the first two major fluxes. Subsequent flooding occurred after these three events and before the final outburst, but they are not considered, as their resultant fluxes were generally weaker and did not precede substantial cooling.

=== Effects of freshwater fluxes on ocean circulation ===
In order to gain an idea of the effect that large freshwater fluxes into the ocean would have on global ocean circulation, numerical modeling is needed. Of particular importance to the cases of freshwater fluxes from Lake Agassiz are the locations of their entry into the ocean and the rapidity at which they entered. The likely outcome is that the fluxes themselves, combined with the effect of the re-direction of the Agassiz Baseline flow, had an appreciable impact on ocean circulation and consequently climate. Some simulations of North Atlantic Deep Water formation confirm that the oceans and the thermohaline circulation are affected by these fluxes. Small increases in freshwater fluxes have been shown to reduce the thermohaline circulation and in some cases could halt the production of North Atlantic Deep Water all together.

One particular model allowed for a flux of 1 Sv of freshwater into high latitudes of the Atlantic Ocean for a period of 10 years, which resulted in a sudden drop of sea surface temperatures and a weaker thermohaline circulation. It was nearly 200 years before the ocean system returned to normal in this case. Another modeling study by the same research group indicated that if just 0.1 Sv of freshwater was added to high North Atlantic Ocean latitudes, sea surface temperatures could drop by as much as 6 °C in less than 100 years, also weakening the thermohaline circulation, albeit less so than with higher freshwater fluxes.

Additionally, it has been found from a separate study that a freshwater flux of 0.53 Sv into the North Atlantic Ocean in the absence of an existing thermohaline circulation could reduce North Atlantic Deep Water production by 95% in about a century. Large fluxes such as this are capable of cooling the oceans and climate on a large scale. If freshwater fluxes into the Northern Atlantic Ocean were stopped once the North Atlantic Deep Water production had completely ceased, production did not begin again.

The above modeling studies suggest that even if the fluxes during the major outburst events of Lake Agassiz occurred over longer time periods, thus being weaker in magnitude, they still would have possibly been sufficient to trigger a change in thermohaline circulation and climate change.

=== Climate change resulting from Lake Agassiz outbursts ===
==== The Younger Dryas ====
Lake Agassiz did not exist long before the Younger Dryas cold period, so changes in the thermohaline circulation and climate before then would have probably been caused by re-routing of other North American drainage basins, possibly coupled with an influx of icebergs. However, the Younger Dryas cold period has been linked to flood water diversion from Lake Agassiz. Water that normally flowed through the Mississippi River to the Gulf of Mexico was re-routed into the Great Lakes and the St. Lawrence River about 12.8 ka calendar years ago. There is uncertainty as to whether this change was enough to trigger the Younger Dryas, but the runoff through the Mississippi River could have pre-conditioned the thermohaline circulation prior to the cold period and outburst. Additionally, if the outburst at 12.9 ka calendar years was actually as intense as 0.30 Sv, its combination with the diversion of Agassiz drainage through the St. Lawrence River into the North Atlantic Ocean was likely the cause of the Younger Dryas. The value of 0.30 Sv through the St. Lawrence River would have been significant, as the baseline drainage was only 0.047 Sv through that river.

==== The Preboreal Oscillation ====
The next cooling to follow the Younger Dryas phase was the Preboreal Oscillation. It is thought by some that this period was caused by freshwater outbursts from the Baltic Ice Lake to the Nordic Sea, but this cooling also closely followed the Lake Agassiz outbursts that occurred 11.7 and 11.2 ka calendar years. The outflow from Lake Agassiz at these times resulted in similar freshwater flux values into the Arctic Ocean as have been estimated from the Baltic Ice Lake to the Nordic Sea, so it seems likely that Lake Agassiz at least contributed to the Preboreal Oscillation cooling. However, this period of cooling was not as intense as that during the Younger Dryas for a few reasons. First, the outburst from Lake Agassiz during the Preboreal Oscillation flooded into the Arctic, instead of the North Atlantic Ocean as during the Younger Dryas. Also, as the period leading up to the Preboreal Oscillation was interstadial to interglacial, the thermohaline circulation would have been more stable than during the Younger Dryas. Finally, the North Atlantic thermohaline circulation was not being pre-conditioned preceding the Preboreal Oscillation, as meltwater from Lake Agassiz was not being routed to the Gulf of Mexico.

==== The final Lake Agassiz-induced cooling ====
Analysis of Greenland ice cores, ocean core samples, and other sources have revealed a large-scale cooling around 8.4 – 8.0 ka calendar years As such, it has been concluded that this cold event was likely caused by the final large drawdown and associated massive outburst from Lake Agassiz to the North Atlantic Ocean. Even though more than 10 times the amount of water was released at this point than during the Younger Dryas, and the thermohaline circulation was consequently impacted, the cooling effect was relatively small in intensity. It is thought that this is due to two reasons: 1) the ocean was already in a warm interglacial mode, and 2) the water flowed through the Hudson Strait and entered the North Atlantic Ocean nearly 2000 km to the north of where the outflow had entered the ocean before the Younger Dryas.

== Remaining unknowns ==
Though much is understood about the interactions between large-scale paleoflooding, ocean circulation, and climate, there is still much to learn. Regarding the freshening episodes of the Champlain Sea, the exact locations and timing of drainage into the sea still remain in question. These factors, in turn, affected how ocean circulations, and potentially climate, changed.

What is known of the drainage of Lake Agassiz is largely based on modeling studies. As in the case of the Champlain Sea, the magnitude, timing, and direction of the fluxes from Lake Agassiz greatly influence subsequent consequences. Several questions that remain include, but are not limited to, the following: Are estimates of the baseline flux of Lake Agassiz correct, and are variations in it accurately accounted for? Over what time period, exactly, did the different drainage episodes last? How much water was actually drained during these episodes, and where did it enter the open ocean? What was the exact effect of drainage on the formation of North Atlantic Deep water, the thermohaline circulation, and climate? There are two proposed scenarios for the final drawdown of Lake Agassiz, so which one, if either, is right?

The above are just some of the challenges faced when attempting to reconstruct events in Earth's history. Though it is a difficult field of study, advancements in the understanding of proxies for, and indicators of, certain environmental parameters in the geologic record are constantly being made.
