= Elk Point Group =

Stratigraphic unit in the Western Canada and Williston sedimentary basins

- Stratigraphic range: Early to Middle Devonian
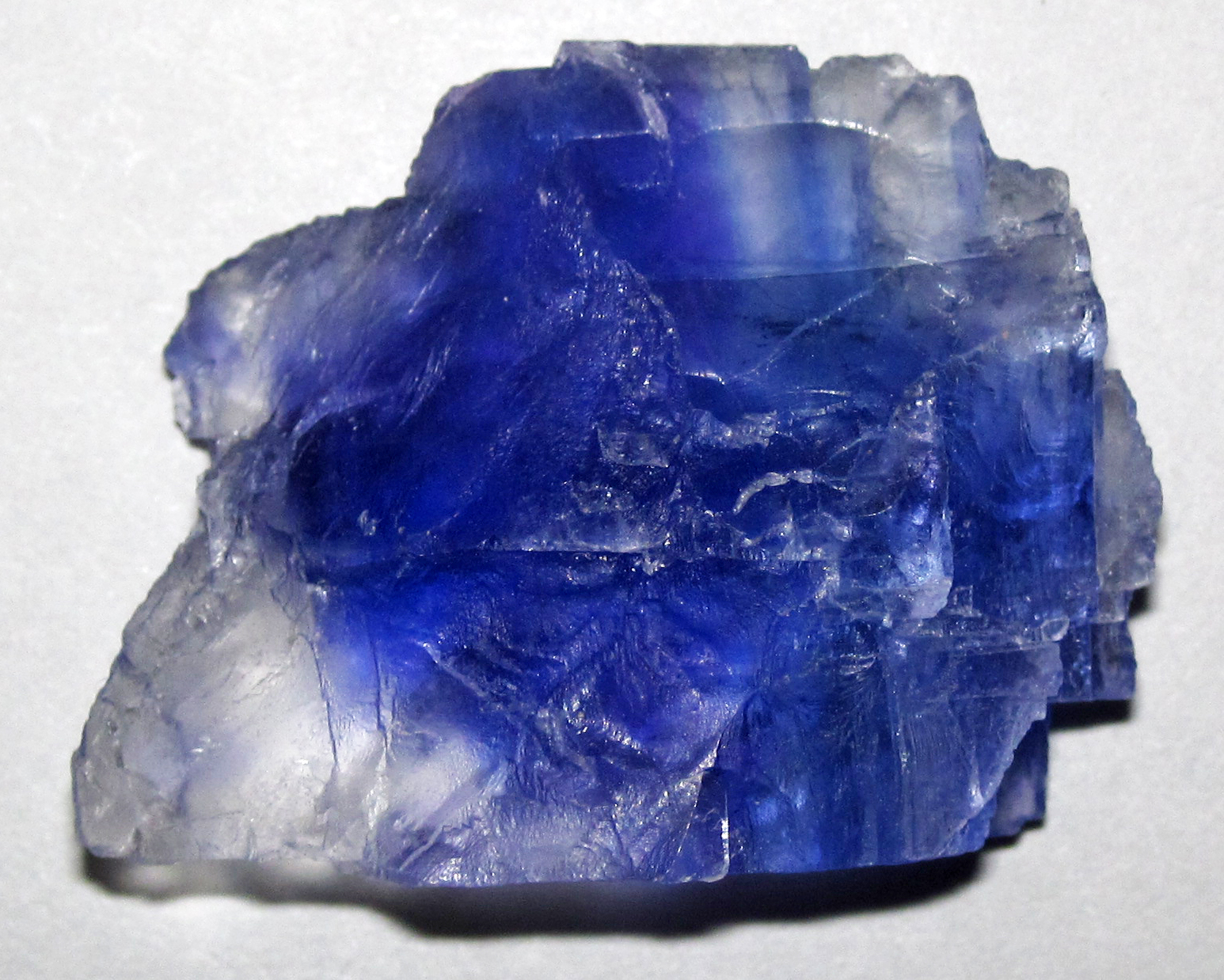
- Blue halite (Prairie Evaporite Formation, upper Elk Point Group, Middle Devonian) from Saskatchewan
- Type: Geological formation
- Sub-units: Upper and Lower Elk Point Group
- Underlies: Beaverhill Lake Group, Manitoba Group
- Overlies: Precambrian to Silurian formations
- Thickness: up to 610 metres (2,000 ft)

Lithology
- Primary: Dolomite, halite, anhydrite
- Other: Limestone, shale, potash

Location
- Coordinates: 53.9053°N 110.6304°W
- Region: Northern plains
- Country: Canada, United States

Type section
- Named for: Elk Point
- Named by: J.R. McGehee

The Elk Point Group is a stratigraphic unit of Early to Middle Devonian age in the Western Canada and Williston sedimentary basins. It underlies a large area that extends from the southern boundary of the Northwest Territories in Canada to North Dakota in the United States. It has been subdivided into numerous formations, number of which host major petroleum and natural gas reservoirs.

== Lithology ==
The formations of the Elk Point Group are composed primarily of carbonate rocks (dolomite and limestone) and evaporitic rocks (halite, anhydrite and potash), with lesser amounts of dolomitic mudstone and shale.

== Paleontology ==
Some of the carbonate formations of the Elk Point Group contain rich assemblages of marine invertebrate fossils, including many species of brachiopods, gastropods, bivalves, cephalopods, crinoids, ostracods and corals. The evaporitic formations are unfossiliferous or contain a few spores and algal remains.

== Environment of deposition ==
The formations of the Elk Point Group were deposited in a marine embayment that stretched from an open ocean in the present-day Northwest Territories of Canada to North Dakota in the United States, covering an area roughly half as large as that covered by today's Mediterranean Sea. At times of low water levels and excessive evaporation, halite and other evaporite minerals were deposited in sabkha, supratidal flat and coastal lagoon environments, and at times of higher water levels carbonate platform sedimentation and reef growth were dominant.

== Distribution and thickness ==
The Elk Point Group extends from the southern boundary of the Northwest Territories through northwestern British Columbia, Alberta, Saskatchewan, and southwestern Manitoba in Canada, and continues into eastern Montana and North Dakota in the United States. It reaches a maximum thickness of about 610 metres (2,000 ft) in eastern Alberta.

== Stratigraphy ==
The Elk Point Group was named for the town of Elk Point, Alberta by J.R. McGehee in 1949. Core from a well that was drilled near Elk Point has been designated as the type section (Anglo-Canadian Elk Point No. 11, 2-11-57-5W4). The group is subdivided into the Lower and Upper Elk Point Group, each of which is further subdivided into formations according to the dominant lithologies, as shown in the tables below.

The Lower Elk Point Group comprises all strata lying below the Winnipegosis Formation (in the south) or the Keg River Formation (in the north) and is present only in the deepest parts of the basin. The Upper Elk Point Group, which is present throughout the basin, includes those formations and all overlying formations to the base of the Manitoba Group (in the south) or the Beaverhill Lake Group (in the north).

=== Subdivisions ===
In northern Alberta and central Alberta, the Elk Point Group contains the following subdivisions, from top to base:

Sub-unit	Age	Lithology	Max. thickness	Reference
Watt Mountain Formation	Givetian	red and green shale, sandstone, anhydrite, dolomite, limestone	74.4 m (240 ft)	
Gilwood Member	Givetian	coarse quartz and feldspathic sandstone	15.2 m (50 ft)	
Presqu'ile Formation	Givetian	crystalline dolomite	300 m (980 ft)	
Sulphur Point Formation	Givetian	fossiliferous limestone, green shale	106 m (350 ft)	
Muskeg Formation	Givetian	anhydrite, salt, dolomite, limestone	270 m (890 ft)	
Zama Member	Givetian	sucrosic dolomite	24 m (80 ft)	
Keg River Formation	Givetian	porous dolomite, wackestone limestone, includes the Rainbow Member (dolomitized reef)	300 m (980 ft)	
Contact Rapids Formation	Eifelian to Givetian	argillaceous dolomite, dolomitic shale	48.8 m (160 ft)	
Chinchaga Formation	Eifelian to Givetian	anhydrite, crystalline dolomite, quartz sandstone, dolomitic shale, halite	76 m (250 ft)	
Cold Lake Formation	Eifelian	halite, dolomitic shale	117 m (380 ft)	
Ernestina Lake Formation	Eifelian	red shale (base), carbonates, anhydrite (top)	23 m (80 ft)	
Lotsberg Formation	Eifelian	halite, calcareous shale	229 m (750 ft)	
La Loche Formation (Basal red beds)	Eifelian	red dolomitic or calcareous shales, silty or sandy, quartzose sandstone	30 m (100 ft)	

In southern Alberta

The Elk Point Group is dolomitic and is not differentiated.

In Saskatchewan, Manitoba and Montana

Sub-unit	Age	Lithology	Max. thickness	Reference
Dawson Bay Formation	Givetian	dolomitic mudstone, crystalline limestone, argillaceous carbonate, bituminous limestone, dolomite, anhydrite, halite	50 m (160 ft)	
Prairie Evaporite Formation	Givetian	halite, anhydrite, dolomite, dolomitic mudstone, limestone, potash	218 m (720 ft)	
Winnipegosis Formation	Givetian	dolomite, bituminous carbonates, anhydrite	100 m (330 ft)	
Ashern Formation	Eifelian to Givetian	argillaceous dolomite and dolomitic shale and siltstone; minor anhydrite	55 m (180 ft)	
Meadow Lake Formation	Eifelian	dolomite with mudstone interbeds, limestone and sandstone at base	56 m (180 ft)	

== Relationship to other units ==
The Elk Point Group is conformably overlain by the Manitoba Group in Manitoba and Saskatchewan, and by the Beaverhill Lake Group in Alberta. It rests unconformably on Precambrian basement rocks in northern Alberta, on Cambrian strata in northeastern Alberta and in Saskatchewan, and on Ordovician to Silurian formations in western Alberta, Saskatchewan and southwestern Manitoba. In the Northwest Territories, some of its uppermost units are exposed at surface or are unconformably overlain by Cretaceous strata.

The Lower Elk Point Group is equivalent to the Stone Formation and its equivalents, and the Headless and Nahanni Formations, in northeastern British Columbia and the southwestern Northwest Territories. In the same areas, the Upper Elk Point includes the Pine Point Group, and is equivalent to parts of the Horn River Formation, Besa River Formation, and others.

== Petroleum and natural gas ==
The porous carbonate rocks of the Elk Point Group host major petroleum and natural gas reservoirs. As of 1994, the Initial Established Recoverable Petroleum Reserves and the Cumulative Petroleum Production for the group were estimated at 339.3 and 240.4 million cubic metres, respectively. For natural gas, the Initial Established Marketable Reserves and the Cumulative Production were estimated at 142.7 and 79.5 billion cubic metres, respectively.
