= Manitoba Group =

Geologic group

- Stratigraphic range: Middle Devonian to Late Devonian
- Type: Geological group
- Sub-units: Souris River Formation; Hubbard Evaporite; Dawson Bay Formation
- Underlies: Duperow Formation 9Saskatchewan Group
- Overlies: Prairie Evaporite Formation, Winnipegosis Formation (Elk Point Group)
- Thickness: up to 244 metres (800 ft)

Lithology
- Primary: Shale, carbonate, evaporite

Location
- Region: WCSB
- Country: Canada

Type section
- Named for: Manitoba
- Named by: A.D. Baillie, 1953

The Manitoba Group is a stratigraphic unit of middle to late Devonian age in the Western Canadian Sedimentary Basin.

The group takes its name from the province of Manitoba, and was first defined by A.D. Baillie in 1953.

== Lithology ==
The Manitoba Group is composed of alternating cycles of shale, carbonate and evaporite.

== Distribution ==
The Manitoba Group occurs in outcrop in southwestern Manitoba and in the sub-surface in southern Saskatchewan, North Dakota and Montana. It reaches a maximum thickness of 150 metres (490 ft) in outcrop and up to 244 metres (800 ft) in the sub-surface.

== Subdivisions ==
The following formationas are recognised, from top to bottom:

- The Souris River Formation appears in the upper part of the Manitoba Group, is of Givetian to Frasnian age and consists of thin shale-carbonate-evaporite cycles.
- The Hubbard Evaporite is recognised at the top of the Montana Group in the Elk Point Basin. Its age is Givetian
- The Dawson Bay Formation is the lower part of the Manitoba Group. It is of Givetian age and consists of red shale (the "Second Red Bed") and a sequence of limestone and dolomitic limestone.

== Relationship to other units ==
The Manitoba Group is conformably overlain by the Duperow Formation and disconformably overlays the Prairie Evaporite Formation or Winnipegosis Formation of the Elk Point Group.

The lower Manitoba Group is equivalent to the Muskeg Formation in northern Alberta, while the upper part correlates with the Beaverhill Lake Formation.
