= Induced seismicity in Canada =

With the development of both conventional and unconventional resources in Canada, induced seismicity caused by anthropological activities has been observed, documented, and studied.

Induced events are generally smaller in magnitude than the most 'important' earthquakes documented by Natural Resources Canada. The largest natural earthquakes are generally located in the coastal regions of the country. The majority of large, natural seismic events in Western Canada are located near the Cascadia and Juan de Fuca Subduction Zones. The majority of large, natural seismic events in Eastern Canada are localized to distinct seismic zones like the Charlevoix-Kamouraska region. The only 'important' interior earthquakes, as classified by Natural Resources Canada, are the two strike-slip fault failures of local magnitude (M_{L}) 6.6 and 6.9 observed in the Nahanni region of the Northwest Territories. Induced earthquakes, however, tend to occur in a 150-km-wide band east of the Canadian Rocky Mountains where the tectonic strain rate is relatively high.

Induced seismicity in Canada is mainly related to hydraulic fracturing and wastewater disposal. Within the central Western Canadian Sedimentary Basin (WCSB), evidence shows that geological factors likely influence the nature of induced seismicity related to hydraulic fracturing operations, as they share two characterizations in terms of spatial distributions:

1. Pre-existing basement-controlled faults are more likely to be triggered based on the focal depth analysis of earthquake clusters;

2. The lateral distributions of earthquake clusters are significantly correlated with the margins of the fossil reef structures in the Swan Hills Formation.

These phenomena can be explained by the regional- and local-scale geological evolution of this area. First, basement tectonics play a role in reef growth which were nucleated on elevated structures during the Devonian period. Second, the generation of dolomitized strata requires deep-seated faults to transport Mg-enriched fluid, which can later provide transport conduits for injected fluids, thereby creating hydraulic connections with the reservoir. Dolomitization of Devonian strata increased the formation permeability and generated greater fluid diffusivity, thus more induced seismicity occurred.

A total of 216 induced earthquakes occurred between 2009 and 2011 at the Etsho and Kiwigana fields in Horn River, Canada. Of those, 19 were between magnitudes (M_{L}) 2 and 3, and the largest felt event reached M_{L} 3.8. Seismicity was temporally correlated to pumping fluids during hydraulic fracture treatments, with earthquakes starting several hours after the onset of pumping. Since at least 2009, the Horn River Basin has been the site of induced seismicity associated with oil and gas activities. The BC Oil and Gas Commission states that over 8,000 hydraulic fracturing completions have had no associated anomalous seismicity in this region between 2009 and 2011.

Studies on induced seismicity have been ongoing since the 1970s. Focus on the cause of induced seismicity has shifted from activities related to conventional resources like mining to unconventional resource exploration and production. Barriers to understanding induced seismicity processes include lack of access to subsurface hydrogeological and geomechanical data, insufficient stress state data, and limited records of seismicity at the nucleation process scale.

== Mechanism ==
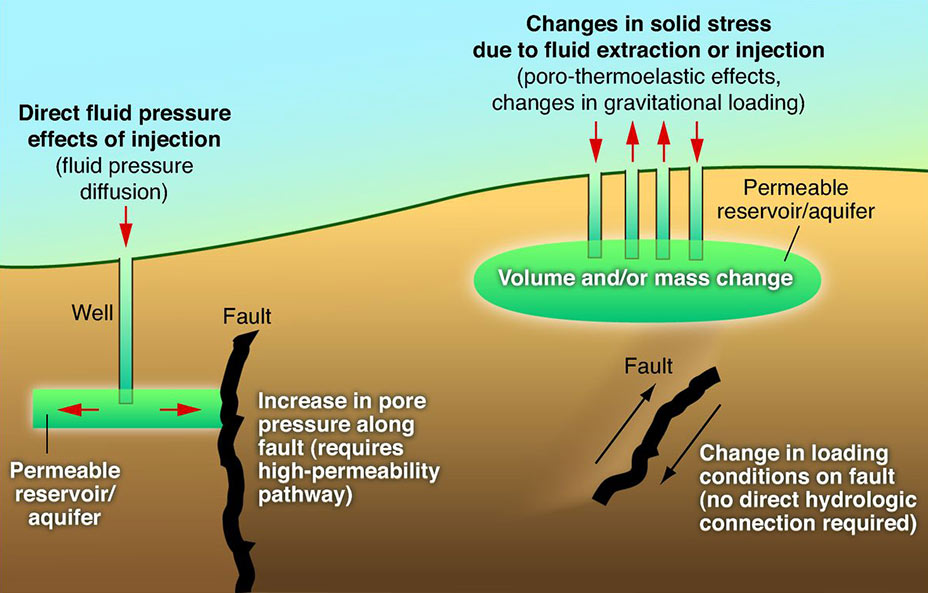
Figure 2. Mechanisms of induced seismicity. Left: earthquake triggered by pore pressure increase. Right: earthquake triggered by total stress changes acting on the fault plane.

The mechanism of induced seismicity can be categorized based on different causes. It is widely accepted that impoundment of reservoirs, mining, oil and gas exploration and production, including injecting fluids to the subsurface and extracting oil and gas from the underground, are related to induced seismic events.

Industrial operations that create tremor movement of the ground, such as mining and seismic data collecting, are often a cause of induced seismicity. In the vicinity of deep mining activities, seismicities are often related to rockbursts - the violent failure of rock due to excavation. The magnitudes of these seismic events, however, are dependent on the local geological settings, such as the rock properties, faulting system, and regional stresses. For geophysical exploration activities, usually seismic waves are generated by man-made explosions to help the geophysicists understand the underground formations and structures. These explosions are far away from the population-dense areas.

Induced seismicity related to fluid injection is generally triggered by two basic mechanisms (Fig. 2): pore pressure perturbation via direct hydrologic connections and/or a change in total stress on pre-existing fault through poroelastic transmissions. A fault will be activated once the shear stress on the fault plane $\tau$ reaches a critical value $\tau_c$:

$\tau_c=c+(\sigma_n-P_p)\tan\phi$

where $c$ is the cohesive strength, $\tau_c$ is the normal stress on the fault plane, $P_p$ is the pore pressure and $\tan\phi$ is the coefficient of friction. This can also be explained by Mohr-Coulomb failure criterion.

If the fault is hydraulically connected to the permeable reservoir, fluid pressure $P_p$ will increase due to fluid injection leading to a decrease in the effective normal stress: $\sigma_n'=\sigma_n-P_p$; thus, the critical shear stress $\tau_c$ will be reduced, resulting in less frictional resistance to shear slip.

For remote faults without direct hydrologic connection to the permeable reservoir, they can be triggered by total stress changes as a result of poro-thermoelastic effects. Based on the mass balance principal, the volume of the reservoir should be enlarged after injection, which can alter the stress field outside of the reservoir. By changing the total stress (e.g., increasing $\tau$ and/or reducing $\sigma_n$), faults, especially for near-critically stressed or optimally oriented faults, can be reactivated.

== History of induced seismicity in Canada ==
Induced seismicity has been documented in Canada since 1970. Many publications differentiate these events from natural earthquakes and attribute them to specific industrial activities using the Davis and Frohlich criteria. In Canada, induced seismic events have been attributed to fluid extraction, fluid injection and wastewater disposal, mining, hydraulic fracturing, and reservoir impoundment. Carbon capture and sequestration (CCS) is considered to be a risk factor for induced seismicity, but no minor seismic events or larger (defined with a moment magnitude [M_{W}] of 2.0 or above) have been observed to date.

=== Fluid extraction ===
Several cases of induced seismicity attributed to fluid extraction have been documented in Western Canada. An earthquake swarm with two events exceeding M_{w} 4 was attributed to gas extraction in the Strachan field near Rocky Mountain House, Alberta in the 1970s. A series of earthquakes was also observed between 1984 and 1994 near Fort St. John, British Columbia and attributed to gas extraction and secondary recovery (the injection of fluid to maintain pressure during hydrocarbon recovery). Events were observed within Permian strata up to M_{L} 4.3.

=== Fluid injection ===
The first case documented of induced seismicity occurred on March 8, 1970 within the Snipe Lake oil field, northwest of Edmonton Alberta, resulting in a shallow M_{L} 5.1 event. Secondary recovery or waste disposal were also attributed to the induced events (M_{L} 2.0) documented in Cold Lake, Alberta by Nicolson and Wessen. A series of earthquakes that occurred between 1994 and 2012 in the Cordel Field in Alberta were attributed to wastewater injection. The series of earthquakes resulted in two M_{L} 4.0 events on March 31, 1997 and July 2, 2001. The British Columbia Oil and Gas Commission (BCOGC) documented several incidents of wastewater disposal induced seismicity in the Pintail and Graham areas of British Columbia. The Pintail events occurred between 2013 and 2015 and resulted in events up to M_{L} 3.1. The Graham events occurred between 2003 and 2015 and result in events up to M_{L} 4.0. Secondary oil recovery also triggered seismicity in Cambrian strata near Gobles, Ontario in the 1980s, with several events exceeding M_{L} 3.0.

=== Mining ===
Separating natural earthquakes from mining related seismicity is difficult since most mines are also located in seismically active regions of Canada and the routine blasting at the mines is registered in Canadian seismic catalogues. For example, the Western Canadian Composite Seismicity Catalogue documented 3,898 earthquakes above moment magnitude 2 that were attributed to blasting as of July 2017.

Induced seismicity up to body wave magnitude (M_{b}) 5.0 has been documented at Devonian Potash mines in Saskatchewan and at Cretaceous coal mines in northern Ontario. One such sequence of earthquakes occurred in a potash mine near Saskatoon between 1979 and 1980 and another sequence occurred between 2005 and 2015, culminating in a M_{b} 4.0 event near Yorkton, Saskatchewan in January 2015.

Seven incidents of mining induced seismicity were documented in Ontario Canada between 2006 and 2009, with magnitudes ranging from M_{L} 2.4 to M_{L} 4.1. Documents show that a large series of mining related events occurred at the Strathcona nickel mine near Sudbury, Ontario, reaching M_{L} 2.7 in 1988. Numerous seismic events with magnitudes up to M_{b} 4.1 from 2004 through 2009 in Ontario were also studied and believed to be related to nickel, gold, and copper mines near Sudbury.

=== Hydraulic fracturing ===
Induced seismicity has recently been attributed to hydraulic fracturing in Western Canada. A local magnitude 4.3 was attributed to hydraulic fracturing operations near Fox Creek, Alberta on June 13, 2015. The event represented the first 'red light' event under the Alberta Energy Regulator Subsurface Order 2 and resulted in a 16-day suspension of operations. This event corresponded to sequences of seismicity that were also linked to hydraulic fracturing near the 'red light' event before and after its occurrence.

Numerous induced events, up to M_{w} 3.8, were recorded near Fort Nelson, BC between April 2009 and December 2011. The events were attributed to hydraulic fracturing in Devonian strata. Another series of large seismic events up to M_{w} 4.2 occurred in Triassic strata near Fort St. John between 2013 and 2014. Another large event (M_{w} 4.6) occurred near Fort St. John on August 15, 2015.

Another type of hydraulic fracturing is the Weyburn carbon capture and storage (CCS), yet microseismic monitoring and analysis indicated that the likelihood of a felt event was low, with low rates of seismicity and observed events with M_{w} under 0.

=== Reservoir impoundment ===
Induced seismicity has also been identified as a result of reservoir impoundment. The first documented event swarm, culminating in an M_{b} 4.1 event on October 23, 1975, was documented at the Manicouagan 3 reservoir in Quebec. Another induced event, M_{L} 4.1, occurred near Mica, British Columbia on January 5, 1974 due to reservoir impoundment. An extensive swarm of earthquakes was observed during the filling of the LG3 dam in Quebec between 1981 and 1984, culminating in an M_{b} 3.0 event.

== Distinguishing induced seismicity from natural seismicity ==
The approach to discriminating induced seismicity from natural earthquakes is often based on source parameters, physics-based probabilistic models and statistics-based models. In terms of the source-parameter approach, natural earthquakes are expected to show more double-couple characteristics, where the volumetric change can be negligible. Region-specific attributes can also be an important factor to identify induced seismicity. In the Canadian Shield, for instance, induced events have significantly shallower depths than natural events. Induced seismic events often cluster near operations and occur over a short period of time, while natural earthquakes are more sporadic both in time and locations. Statistical analysis has also observed that clusters of seismicity related to injection are moving away from the injection wells over time.

Even though industrial activities can trigger seismic events, it is still intrinsically difficult to distinguish induced seismicity and natural earthquakes. Difficulties include the observed time lag and displacement between the injection and the detected seismic events, as well as the complexity of the geological setting. For instance, it took approximately 80 minutes from the onset of pumping and evidence for fault reactivation in gas wells in Western Canada, whereas some of the felt seismicity documented in the Horn River Basin occurred several hours after pumping started.

== Regulations ==
Protocols regarding induced seismicity were developed in respect of different causes, from hydraulic fracturing to geothermal related causes. The main purpose of these regulations is to prevent and minimize potential damage of induced seismicity. In Alberta, different subsurface orders are required. According to Section 11.104 of the Oil and Gas Conservation Rules, subsurface orders are issued. For example, Alberta Energy Regulator (AER) issued subsurface No.2 to Duvernay formation. In Fox Creek, the two thresholds are M_{L} 2 and 4. If a seismic event had a magnitude larger than M_{L}4, immediate shut-down is required. In Red Deer, because the operations are closer to residents, two thresholds are M_{L} 1 and 3. In consideration of the dam integrity, subsurface No. 6 is published around the Brazeau Reservoir.The thresholds are M_{L} 1 and 2.5. BC Oil and Gas Commission has a similar protocol, where operations have to stop if the monitored seismicity is larger than M_{L} 4 within 3 km of the operation site.

Besides the regulations enforced by the government, different operators have their own 'traffic light system' and specific mitigations to prevent inducing large earthquakes. Two surveys conducted by the Canadian Society of Exploration Geophysics(CSEG) show that some companies are being proactive with evaluating health, safety, environment, and public relations, and implementing on-site monitoring systems for induced seismicity. Canadian Association of Petroleum Producers (CAPP) also publishes guidebooks based on industry practices to help the operators better manage the risk of induced seismicity.

== Induced seismicity related to hydraulic fracturing ==
=== In British Columbia ===
The majority of induced seismicity in BC has been attributed to hydraulic fracturing. In northern British Columbia, 272 seismic events related to hydraulic fracturing, ranging between M_{L} 1.0 and M_{L} 3.8, were reported from April 2009 to December 2011. No injuries or property damage resulted from the earthquakes and only of one of these events was felt at the ground surface. The Government of BC is conducting a scientific panel aiming to answer inquiries about how regulations affect the industrial activities and how these regulations affect First Nations. More monitors have been installed by BC Oil and Gas Commission (BCOGC) for implementing a better monitoring system for induced seismicity. Aside from earthquakes, potential impacts like water and air pollution also pose concerns to the public.

=== In Alberta ===
In Alberta, most of the largest earthquakes attributed to hydraulic fracturing have been observed in the Devonian strata of the Duvernay and Horn River Basin. A M_{L} 4.44 event was triggered on August 4, 2014 in the Horn River Basin. A M_{L} 4.36 was triggered on January 23, 2015 in the Kaybob Area of the Duvernay. Reef complexes control the geology of both formations and significant subvertical faults are present in both.

An energy company halted their operations as the Alberta Energy Regulator (AER) was working on a review of fracking due to a registered Mw 4.8 earthquake reported about 35 km west of Fox Creek. No damage or injury had been reported from the earthquake but it was felt and caused noticeable ground shaking. A site survey was conducted by AER and operations were not restarted until mitigation plans were approved by the regulator.

Seismic monitoring and reporting requirements for hydraulic fracturing operators are implemented in the Fox Creek area for safe and environmental purposes by AER. Seismic events of a registered magnitude of 4.0 or greater are reported online by AER, as well as a real-time seismic event map. There are more than 40 seismic monitoring stations in Alberta.
