= Nahanni Formation =

- Stratigraphic range: Givetian
- Type: Geological formation
- Underlies: Fort Simpson Formation; Horn River Formation
- Overlies: Headless Formation
- Thickness: up to 137 metres (450 ft)

Lithology
- Primary: Limestone

Location
- Coordinates: 61°03′0″N 123°37′0″W
- Region: WCSB
- Country: Canada

Type section
- Named for: Nahanni Butte
- Named by: C.O. Hage
- Year defined: 1945

The Nahanni Formation is a stratigraphic unit of Givetian age in the Western Canadian Sedimentary Basin.

It takes the name from Nahanni Butte, a prominent ridge at the confluence of the South Nahanni River and Liard River, and was first described in outcrop on the south face of the mountain by C.O. Hage in 1945.

== Lithology ==
The Nahanni Formation is composed of dolomitic limestone.

=== Petroleum geology ===
gas is produced from the Nahanni Formation in the Mackenzie River Valley.

=== Paleontology ===
The Nahanni Formation contains paleofauna composed of corals, brachiopods and trilobites.

== Distribution ==
The Nahanni Formation reaches a maximum thickness of 137 metres (450 ft) at Nahanni Butte, and has typical thickness of 60 metres (200 ft). It occurs from the Franklin Mountains in the north to north-eastern British Columbia in the south.

== Relationship to other units ==
The Nahanni Formation is conformably overlain by the Fort Simpson Formation in the west and by the Horn River Formation in the east. It overlays the Headless Formation diachronically and transitionally, with younger deposits occurring in the west.

It is equivalent to the upper part of the Hume Formation in the Mackenzie River area, as well as the Lonely Bay Formation, Pine Point Formation and Little Buffalo Formation in the Great Slave Lake area. In northern Alberta it corresponds to the Keg River Formation.
