= La Loche Formation =

Geologic formation in Canada

- Stratigraphic range: Early Middle Devonian
- Type: Geological formation
- Unit of: Elk Point Group
- Underlies: Contact Rapids Formation, Chinchaga Formation
- Overlies: Canadian Shield
- Thickness: Up to 30 metres (100 ft)

Lithology
- Primary: Sandstone, arkose, mudstone
- Other: Conglomerate, breccia

Location
- Coordinates: 56°44′04″N 109°29′37″W
- Region: Alberta; Saskatchewan
- Country: Canada

Type section
- Named for: Lac La Loche, Saskatchewan
- Named by: A. W. Norris, 1963

The La Loche Formation is a geologic formation of early Middle Devonian (Eifelian) age in the Western Canada Sedimentary Basin. It is present in northeastern Alberta and northwestern Saskatchewan and was first described by A. W. Norris in 1963, who named it for a Roman Catholic Mission at Lac La Loche. Its type section is located at Contact Rapids on the Clearwater River in Saskatchewan, northwest of Lac La Loche. It is not fossiliferous.

== Lithology ==
The basal portion of the La Loche Formation consists of pale brown to reddish, fine- to coarse-grained arkosic and conglomeratic sandstones that may include weathered, angular clasts of the underlying Precambrian granitic gneiss. Planar bedding, cross-bedding, and graded bedding are common in the sandstones. Sandy dolomite, shale, and thin beds of anhydrite and gypsum are present in the upper portion. The formation is not fossiliferous.

== Environment of deposition ==
The La Loche Formation marked the beginning of the deposition of the Elk Point Group at the onset of a marine transgression over the Canadian Shield. The Shield had been exposed to a long period of erosion, and the basal portion of the La Loche is regolithic; that is, it is composed of sand, silt, and gravel derived from the underlying Precambrian rocks that was lying on the Precambrian surface at that time. Bedding textures indicate fluvial to marginal marine depositional environments.

== Distribution and thickness ==
The La Loche Formation is present in northeastern Alberta and northwestern Saskatchewan. It is up to 6 metres (20 ft) thick in outcrop, and ranges from about 6 metres (20 ft) to 30 metres (100 ft) thick in the subsurface around Fort McMurray, Alberta. It is thickest in low areas on the Precambrian surface and thin to absent over high areas.

== Relationship to other units ==
The La Loche Formation is the basal unit of the Elk Point Group and rests unconformably on the eroded Canadian Shield. It is gradationally overlain by the Contact Rapids Formation in the Clearwater River area, and by the Chinchaga or the Keg River Formation in the Slave River area north of Lake Athabasca. It may be considered equivalent to the Contact Rapids or Chinchaga Formation in some areas, and may also be referred to as the Basal red beds or the Granite Wash.
