= Slave Point Formation =

Geologic formation in Canada

- Stratigraphic range: Middle Devonian
- Type: Geological formation
- Underlies: Beaverhill Lake Group, Waterways Formation, Horn River Formation
- Overlies: Fort Vermilion Formation, Watt Mountain Formation, Sulphur Point Formation, Presqu'ile Formation
- Thickness: up to 120 metres (390 ft)

Lithology
- Primary: Limestone, dolomite
- Other: Shale

Location
- Coordinates: 61.18183°N 115.93443°W
- Region: WCSB
- Country: Canada

Type section
- Named for: Slave Point, Great Slave Lake
- Named by: Cameron, A.E., 1918

The Slave Point Formation is a stratigraphic unit of Middle Devonian age in the Western Canadian Sedimentary Basin.

It takes the name from Slave Point, a promontory on the north-west shore of the Great Slave Lake, and was first described in outcrop on the southern shore of the lake and along the Buffalo River by A.E. Cameron in 1918. It was subsequently defined in the subsurface by J. Law in 1955, based on lithology encountered in the California Standard Steen River 2-22-117-5W6M well in Alberta.

== Lithology ==
The Slave Point Formation is composed of brown limestone, crystalline dolomite and shale laminae. It contains stromatoporoids in north-eastern British Columbia and southern Northwest Territories and in the Peace River Arch.

== Distribution ==
The Slave Point Formation has a thickness ranging from 30 metres (100 ft) to 120 metres (390 ft). It occurs in southern Northwest Territories, northeastern British Columbia and northern Alberta.

== Relationship to other units ==
The Slave Point Formation is unconformably overlain by the Beaverhill Lake Group or Waterways Formation in northern Alberta and by the Otter Park Member or Muskwa Member of the Horn River Formation in north-eastern British Columbia. It conformably overlays the Fort Vermilion Formation (or is unconformably overlain by the Watt Mountain Formation) in northern Alberta, and it is conformably overlain by the Sulphur Point Formation or Presqu'ile Formation in north-eastern British Columbia.

It is equivalent to the lower Swan Hills Formation and partly to the Livock River Formation.
