= Prairie Evaporite Formation =

Geologic formation of Givetian age

- Stratigraphic range: Middle Devonian (Givetian)
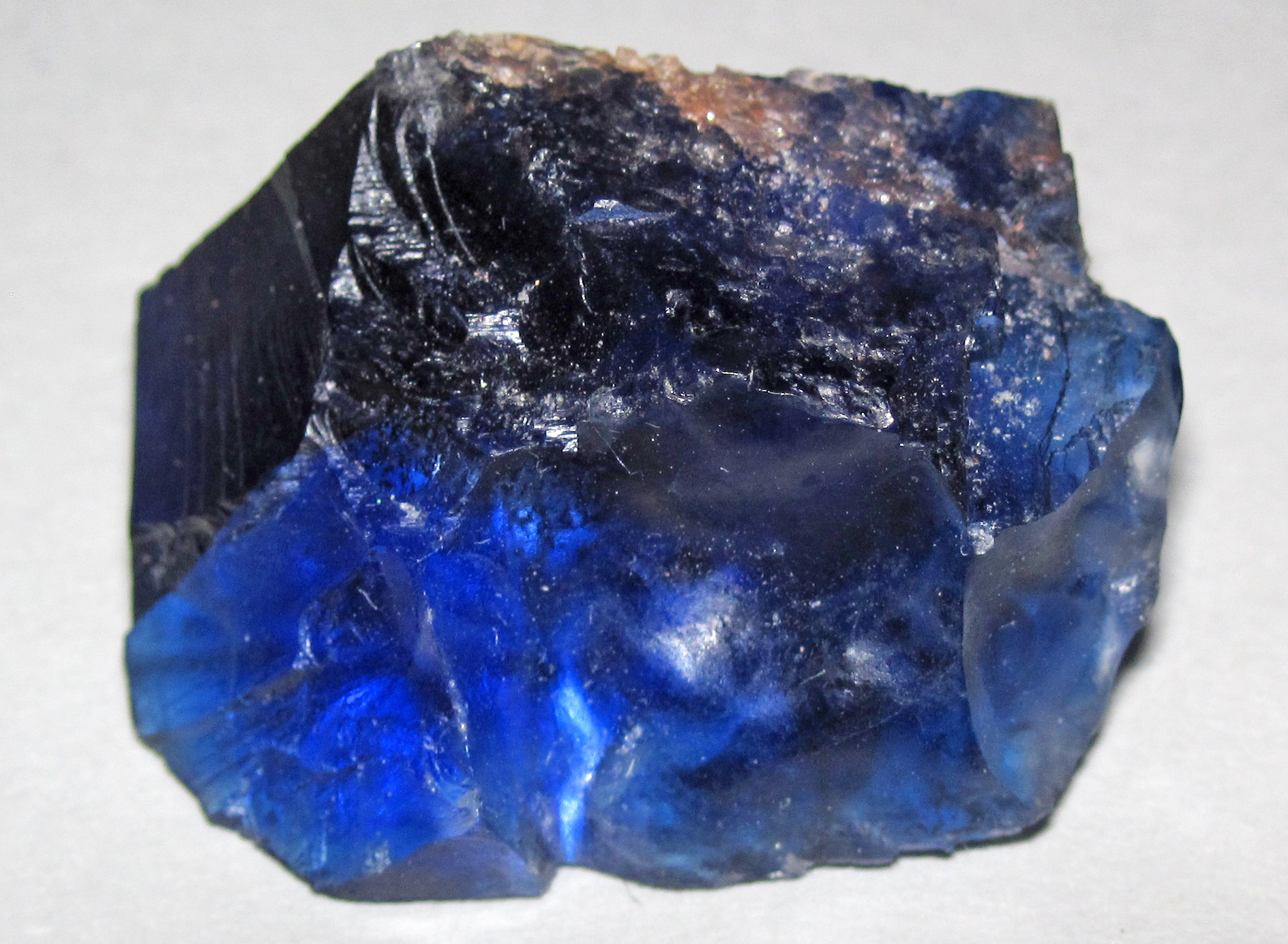
- Blue halite from the Prairie Evaporite Formation
- Type: Geological formation
- Unit of: Elk Point Group
- Sub-units: Up to 6 members
- Underlies: Watt Mountain Formation and Dawson Bay Formation
- Overlies: Keg River Formation and Winnipegosis Formation
- Thickness: Up to 300 metres (980 ft)

Lithology
- Primary: Halite, anhydrite
- Other: Dolomite, mudstone

Location
- Region: Alberta, Saskatchewan, Manitoba, North Dakota, Montana
- Country: Canada, United States

Type section
- Named by: A.D. Baillie (1953)

The Prairie Evaporite Formation, also known as the Prairie Formation, is a geologic formation of Middle Devonian (Givetian) age that consists primarily of halite (rock salt) and other evaporite minerals. It is present beneath the plains of northern and eastern Alberta, southern Saskatchewan and southwestern Manitoba in Canada, and it extends into northwestern North Dakota and northeastern Montana in the United States.

The formation is a major source of potash, most of which is used for fertilizer production. Salt is also produced from the formation, and solution caverns are created in its thick salt beds for natural gas storage.

== Lithology ==
The Prairie Evaporite Formation consists thick beds of halite, with interbeds of anhydrite, dolomite, dolomitic mudstone and claystone. In southern Saskatchewan and northern North Dakota it includes major deposits of sylvite and carnallite that are mined for their potassium content. Gypsum is present in areas where anhydrite has been altered by reaction with groundwater.

== Environment of deposition ==
The Prairie Evaporite Formation was deposited in an embayment called the Elk Point Basin. It extended from an open ocean in the present-day Northwest Territories in Canada to northern North Dakota in the United States, covering an area roughly 30% to 40% as large as that covered by today's Mediterranean Sea. An extensive reef complex called the Presqu'ile Barrier developed across the mouth of the embayment, blocking it from the open ocean and restricting the inflow of sea water. Low water levels and excessive evaporation resulted in the deposition of halite and other evaporite minerals in sabkha, supratidal flat and coastal lagoon environments, ultimately leading to the accumulation of potash minerals in the southern part of the area. These events can be compared to the drying of the Mediterranean Sea that occurred during late Miocene time. That event, called the Messinian salinity crisis, resulted in the deposition of sequences of evaporite minerals up to 1,600 metres (5,250 ft) thick.

Groundwater has gained access to Prairie Evaporite Formation along its eastern and southern margins, dissolving the halite and other soluble minerals. That process, which is ongoing today, produced a breccia that consists of fragments of overlying formations that collapsed when their support was removed, as well as insoluble material from within the Prairie Evaporite itself.

== Distribution, thickness and depth ==
The Prairie Evaporite Formation is present in the subsurface in the Western Canada and Williston sedimentary basins, extending from northern Alberta to northern North Dakota, a distance of more than 1,500 kilometres (930 mi). It reaches thicknesses of more than 200 metres (660 ft) near Saskatoon in Saskatchewan, and more than 300 metres (980 ft) north of Fort McMurray in Alberta.

The formation is nowhere exposed in outcrop because its minerals are easily dissolved by water. Intact sequences are usually found at depths of more than 500 metres (1,640 ft) below ground surface, where they are protected by overlying aquitards. The potash deposits of Saskatchewan and North Dakota lie at depths exceeding 950 metres (3,120 ft).

== Stratigraphy ==
The Prairie Evaporite Formation is part of the Elk Point Group and was named by A.D. Baillie in 1953 based on a core from a well (Imperial Davidson No. 1, 16-8-27-1W3) that was drilled in southern Saskatchewan. There are no geophysical well logs for that core, however, and some intervals were removed for analysis, so in 1969 M.E. Holter designated a more complete reference section from another well (White Rose et al. Drake 4-29-32-22W2) to supplement it.

The formation is usually divided into three members in Alberta. The Whitkow Member at the base, which is present locally in the deepest parts of the basin, consists of coarsely crystalline halite with minor anhydrite. The overlying Shell Lake Member consists primarily of anhydrite interbedded with dolomite. The Leofnard Member at the top consists of halite with minor interbeds of dolomite, anhydrite and mudstone.

Additional units are present in the potash-bearing areas of Saskatchewan and North Dakota. They overlie, or are considered to be submembers of, the Leofnard Member. From base to top, they are the Esterhazy, White Bear, Belle Plaine, Patience Lake Members which, in North Dakota, are overlain by the Mountrail and White Lake Members. They are separated by unnamed zones of halite.

== Relationship to other units ==
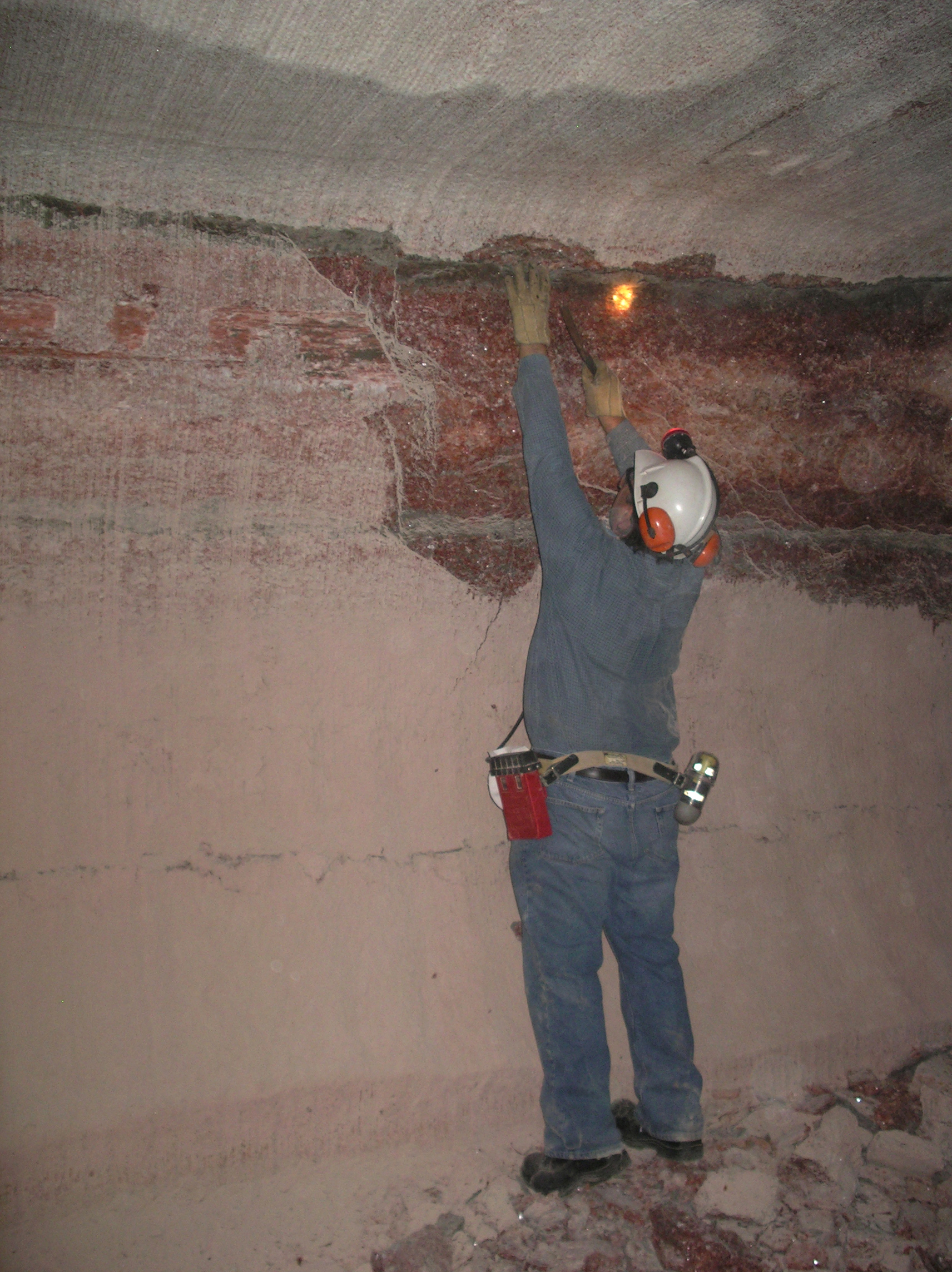
A worker samples potash minerals at a mine in Saskatchewan. Note the thin interbeds of grey claystone.

The contact between the Prairie Evaporite Formation and the underlying Keg River Formation (in the north) and Winnipegosis Formation (in the south) is sharp and conformable. The contact with the overlying Watt Mountain Formation (in the north) and Second Red Bed Member of the Dawson Bay Formation (in the south) is sharp and disconformable.

The northern limit of the formation occurs at about 58° north latitude in Alberta, where the Prairie Evaporite grades into the anyhdritic Muskeg Formation through a decrease in its halite content and an increase in its anhydrite content. Along its eastern and southern margins the formation grades into the breccia that results from the dissolution of its halite and anhydrite. Along its western margin it thins to zero at its depositional limit.

== Economic significance ==
=== Potash and salt ===
In Saskatchewan, underground mining of potash is conducted to depths of about 1,100 metres (3,610 ft), and solution mining is used at greater depths. Reserves suitable for underground and solution mining have been estimated at 14 billion tonnes (15 billion short tons) and more than 42 billion tonnes (46 billion short tons), respectively. As of 2003, there were 2 solution mines and 8 conventional mines operating in Saskatchewan.

Salt is produced primarily as a byproduct of potash mining. For practical purposes, the salt reserves of the Prairie Evaporite Formation are essentially unlimited.

=== Petroleum and natural gas ===
The thick halite beds of the Prairie Evaporite Formation are essentially impermeable, and numerous solution caverns have been artificially created in them to store natural gas and liquified petroleum gas products. Storage of nuclear waste, carbon dioxide, and other waste products has also been discussed. Because of their impermeability, the salt and anhydrite beds of Prairie Evaporite also act as a seal for petroleum and natural gas reservoirs in underlying formations.
