= Pine Point Formation =

- Stratigraphic range: Givetian
- Type: Geological formation
- Underlies: Presqu'ile Formation, Sulphur Point Formation
- Overlies: Chinchaga Formation
- Thickness: up to 115 metres (380 ft)

Lithology
- Primary: Limestone, shale

Location
- Coordinates: 61.01206°N 114.25335°W
- Region: WCSB
- Country: Canada

Type section
- Named for: Pine Point, Northwest Territories
- Named by: A.E. Cameron
- Year defined: 1918

The Pine Point Formation is a stratigraphic unit of Givetian age in the Western Canadian Sedimentary Basin.

It takes the name from Pine Point, a promontory (and former townsite) on the south shore of the Great Slave Lake, west of Fort Resolution, and was first described in outcrop on the shore of the lake between Pine Point and Fort Resolution by A.E. Cameron in 1918.

== Lithology ==
The Pine Point Formation is composed of bituminous limestone and calcareous shale.

== Distribution ==
The Pine Point Formation reaches a thickness of up to 115 metres (380 ft) in its type locality on the shore of the Great Slave Lake.

== Relationship to other units ==
The Pine Point Formation is overlain by the Presqu'ile Formation and Sulphur Point Formation; It conformably overlays the Chinchaga Formation and Fitzgerald Formation.

It is equivalent to Muskeg Formation in northern Alberta, the Dunedin Formation in British Columbia and the upper Nahanni Formation in western Northwest Territories.

== Subdivisions ==
The Pine Point has group status in the southern Northwest Territories, and includes:

- Buffalo River Member
- Horn River Formation shale tongues
- Keg River Formation platform facies was included in the group before 1975
