= Greater Sierra (oil field) =

Oil field in British Columbia, Canada

Greater Sierra (Sierra-Yoyo-Helmet-Desan)
- Location of Greater Sierra in British Columbia
- Country: Canada
- Region: British Columbia
- Offshore/onshore: onshore
- Coordinates: 58°50′N 121°25′W
- Operators: Petrocanada, Husky Oil, Canadian Natural Resources

Field history
- Discovery: 1950s
- Start of production: 1960s

Production
- Producing formations: Jean Marie, Muskwa, Horn River Formation

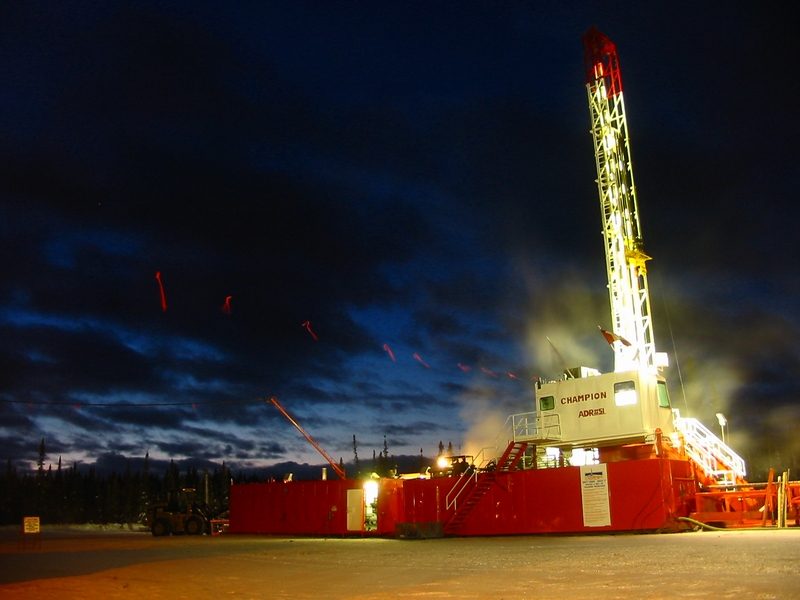
Drilling rig in the Sierra Oil Field

Greater Sierra (also called Helmet Area) is a large oil and gas field in northeastern British Columbia, Canada. It is east and north from the town of Fort Nelson, extending to the Alberta and Northwest Territories borders (150 and 130km respectively).

The discovery of the Clarke Lake field closer to Fort Nelson in 1957 spurred further exploration in the northeastern corner of BC, leading to the discovery of the Sierra natural gas field following years of exploration drilling in 1965, followed by further gas discoveries at Yoyo, and later oil and gas, at Desan and Helmet.

Drilling rig activity takes place largely during the winter months, when the otherwise soft muskeg and boreal forest can be crossed on winter roads. Infrastructure is funded by a combination of private and public funds.

Major projects tap in the large gas reservoirs hosted in Mississippian and Devonian limestones such as the Jean Marie Member of the Redknife Formation. More recent projects extract natural gas from the Muskwa Formation and Horn River Formation. Horizontal drilling and hydraulic fracturing techniques are used to extract the gas from the low permeability shales.

Due to the large extent, the field is served by several airstrips (Helmet Airport, Fort Nelson/Mobil Sierra Airport, Fort Nelson Airport).

Companies with large interests in the area include Canadian Natural Resources and Petro-Canada.

== See also ==
- Canadian Oil Patch
