= Muskeg Formation =

Canadian oil and gas reserve

- Stratigraphic range: Givetian
- Type: Geological formation
- Underlies: Watt Mountain Formation
- Overlies: Keg River Formation
- Thickness: up to 270 metres (890 ft)

Lithology
- Primary: Anhydrite, dolomite
- Other: Halite, limestone

Location
- Coordinates: 59.1725°N 118.7482°W
- Region: Alberta; British Columbia
- Country: Canada

Type section
- Named by: J. Law

The Muskeg Formation is a geologic formation of Middle Devonian (Givetian) age in the Western Canada Sedimentary Basin. It extends from the plains of northwestern Alberta to northeastern British Columbia, and includes important petroleum and natural gas reservoirs in the Zama lake and Rainbow Lake areas of northwestern Alberta.

== Lithology ==
The Muskeg Formation consists primarily of anhydrite, with dolomite, halite (rock salt) and limestone.

== Environment of Deposition ==
The Muskeg Formation was deposited at the northern end of an embayment called the Elk Point Basin, adjacent to an extensive reef complex called the Presqu'ile Barrier. The reef had developed across the mouth of the embayment, blocking the area from the open ocean and restricting the inflow of sea water. The low water levels and excessive evaporation resulted in the deposition of anhydrite, halite and carbonate rocks.

== Distribution and Thickness ==
The Muskeg Formation is present in the northern half of the Elk Point Basin, in northeastern British Columbia and northwestern Alberta. It reaches a maximum reported thickness of 270 metres (890 ft).

== Stratigraphy ==
The Muskeg Formation is part of the Elk Point Group and was established by J. Law in 1955, based on core from a well (California Standard Steen River 2-22-117-5W6M) that was drilled north of Zama Lake.

The formation is usually divided into five members. The Black Creek Member at the base consists of halite. The overlying Lower Anhydrite Member consists of microcrystalline anhydrite with minor beds of fine- to medium-crystalline dolomite. The Zama Member at the center consists of fragmental carbonate, and is overlain by the Upper Anhydrite which consists of interbedded microcrystalline anhydrite and fine- to medium-crystalline dolomite. The Bistcho Member at the top is a fragmental carbonate unit.

== Relationship to other units ==
The Muskeg Formation is disconformably overlain by the Watt Mountain Formation and conformably underlain by the Keg River Formation. It is correlated with the Pine Point Formation, Presqu'ile Formation and Sulphur Point Formation. It grades into the halite-rich Prairie Evaporite Formation to the southeast through a decrease in its anhydrite content and an increase in its halite content.

== Petroleum and Natural Gas ==
The porous carbonate units of the Muskeg Formation contain important oil and natural gas reservoirs in the Zama and Rainbow Lake areas of northwestern Alberta. The impermeable anhydrite and halite beds of the formation act to seal the reservoirs.
