= Preboreal =

Informal stage of the Holocene epoch

The Preboreal is an informal stage of the Holocene epoch. It is preceded by the Tarantian and succeeded by the Boreal. It lasted from 10,300 to 9,000 BP in radiocarbon years or 8350 BC to 7050 BC in Gregorian calendar years (8th millennium BC). It is the first stage of the Holocene epoch. The preboreal oscillation was a short (ca. 150 years) cooling episode within the preboreal.

The Preboreal was an informal subdivision of the Holocene, and as stratigraphy and dating techniques have improved since this 1972 proposal the dates would be different if proposed today. Instead others have begun to use the terms Early, Middle and Late, which would be Lower, Middle and Upper in respect of Holocene sediments. If this terminology were to be used the preboreal would be replaced by Lower Holocene which would be dated 11.7 – 8.2 ka B2K.

In July 2018 the International Commission on Stratigraphy (a part of the IUGS) ratified Greenlandian as the globally recognised first age of the Holocene, much overlapping with the North European regional term Preboreal.
