= Horn River =

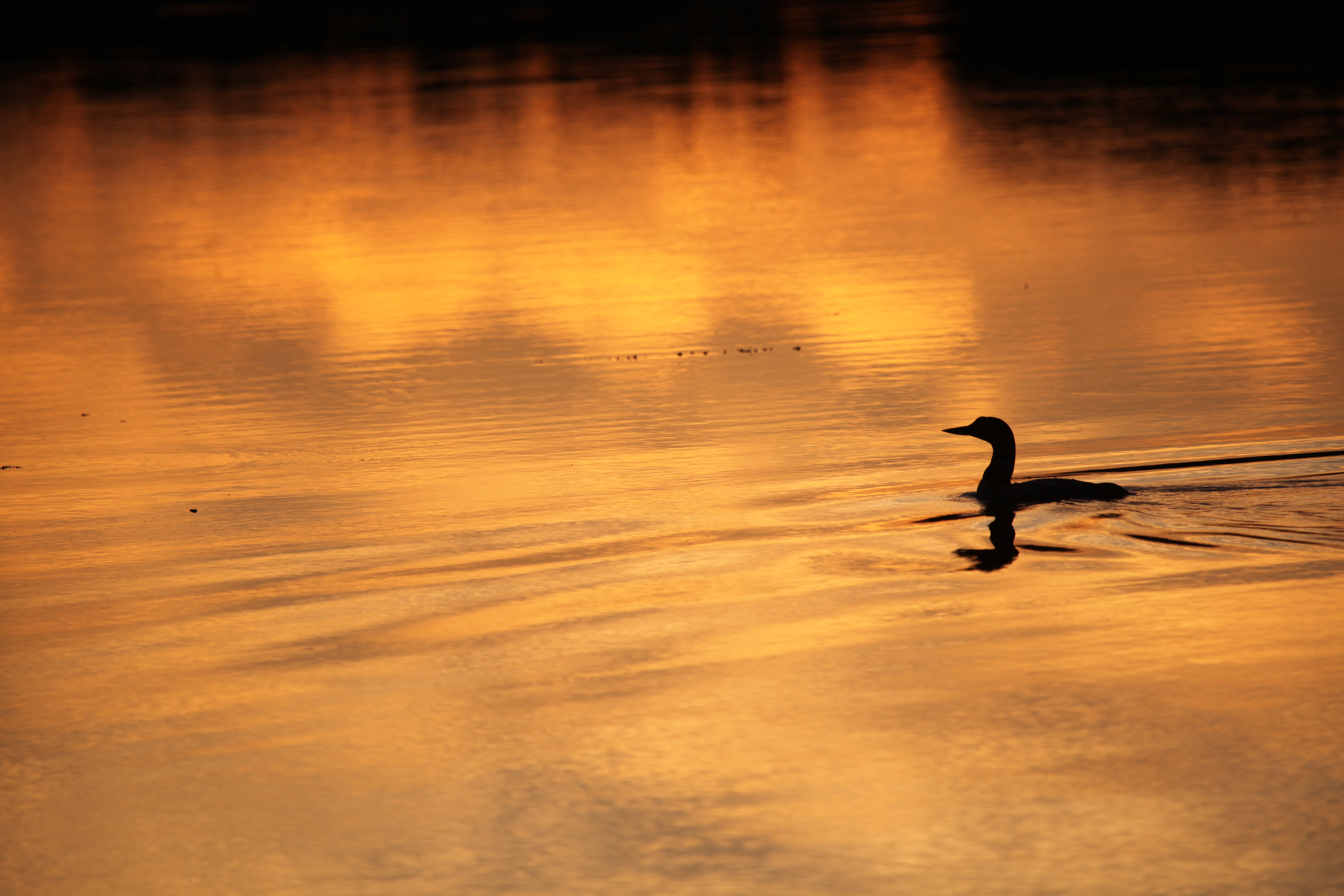
- A common loon on the Horn River at sunrise

Location
- Country: Canada
- Territory: Northwest Territories

Physical characteristics
- Source
  - coordinates: 62.73°N 119.63°W
  - elevation: 240 m (790 ft)
- Mouth
  - location: Mackenzie River
  - coordinates: 61.47665°N 118.08075°W
  - elevation: 150 m (490 ft)

The Horn River is a river in the Northwest Territories of Canada. It is a major tributary of the Mackenzie River.

The river gives the name to the Horn River Formation, a shale deposit of the Western Canadian Sedimentary Basin. The Horn River Basin refers to the extent of the Horn River Formation in the subsurface, and is not defined by the Horn River watershed.

== Course ==
The river originates south of the Great Bear Lake. It flows south-east through a series of rapids north of the Horn Plateau, then has a meandered flow. Fawn Lake is a complex wetland formed along the middle course of the Horn River, and is followed downstream by the Second Lake. The river turns south-west, where the Mink Lake is formed along its course. The Laferte River also flows into the Mink Lake. Horn River then flows south, and it receives the waters of the Bluefish River before it empties into the Mackenzie River, 100 kilometres (62 mi) downstream from the Great Slave Lake), immediately upstream from Mills Lake, at an elevation of 150 metres (490 ft).

The arch made by the river defines the Horn Plateau, a flat elevated area that rises up to 820 metres (2,690 ft)) to the north and east, while the south is defined by the Mackenzie River east of Fort Simpson.

== Tributaries ==
From origin to mouth, the Horn River receives:

Origin	62.73°N 119.63°W
Benner Creek	62.28786°N 117.79134°W
Fawn Lake	62.15557°N 117.58850°W
Second Lake	62.12602°N 117.45326°W
Mink Lake	61.91024°N 117.63208°W
Laferte River	61.87723°N 117.72606°W
Bluefish River	61.51520°N 117.96175°W
Mackenzie River	61.47546°N 118.08229°W

== See also ==
- List of rivers of the Northwest Territories
