= Preboreal oscillation =

Cooling period during the preboreal stage

The preboreal oscillation (PBO) was a short cooling period within the preboreal stage of the Holocene epoch.

== Definition ==
Based on evidence from pollen, early Holocene cooling periods have been discovered already from the 1960s on. At least, in the German-speaking Literature, they were referred to as ‘Rammelbeek Phase’, and ‘Piottino Oscillation’ (Switzerland). The term "preboreal oscillation" was derived from attempts to synchronize these events.

== Dating ==
The Greenland ice cores record a distinct decline in stable oxygen isotope data dated to 11 650–11 270 ice layer a BP (11 700–11 320 b2k) with the coldest part between 11 470 and 11 350 ice layer a BP (11 520–11 400 b2k) labelled as the ‘11.4 ka event’.

In lake sedimentary records, the exact timing and duration of the PBO remain uncertain because of dating uncertainties due to two early Holocene radiocarbon plateau and unclear proxy evidence. Two ash layers derived from volcanic eruptions are frequently used as time markers for the PBO: the Askja-S and Hässeldalen tephras shortly before and after the event. The ages of these layers were constrained to 11.228 ± 226 cal a BP and 11.380 ± 216 cal a BP, framing the cold event to a maximum duration of 152 +11/-8 years by varve counting.
