= Horn River Formation =

Canadian geological formation and natural gas field

- Stratigraphic range: Middle to Late Devonian
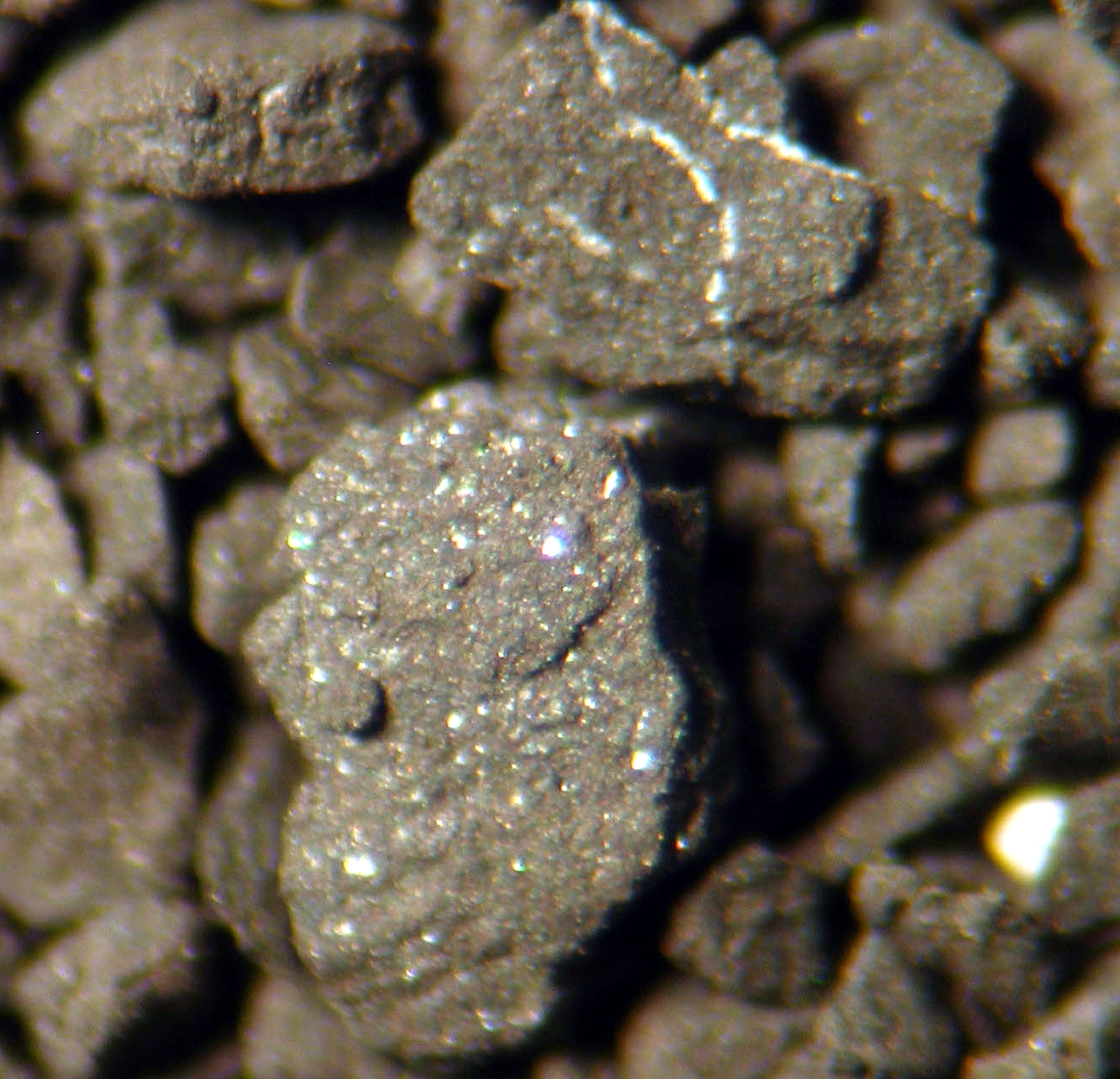
- Drill cuttings sample seen through microscope
- Type: Geological formation
- Sub-units: Muskwa Member, Otter Park Member, Evie Member
- Underlies: Fort Simpson Formation
- Overlies: Pine Point Formation
- Thickness: up to 320 metres (1,050 ft)

Lithology
- Primary: Shale
- Other: Limestone

Location
- Coordinates: 61.73333°N 117.75000°W
- Region: British Columbia, Northwest Territories
- Country: Canada

Type section
- Named for: Horn River
- Named by: Whittaker, 1922
- Horn River Formation (Canada)

The Horn River Formation (also Horn River Shale) is a stratigraphic unit of Devonian (early Givetian to late Frasnian) age in the Western Canadian Sedimentary Basin.

It is a thick sequence of marine sediments that was first described in outcrop on the banks of the Horn River, a tributary of the Mackenzie River, in the Northwest Territories (at the time District of Mackenzie) by Whittaker in 1922, and it takes its name from that river. In 1963 it was redefined in the subsurface of the Fort Nelson area of British Columbia (well Fort Nelson a-95-J/94-J-10) by F.F. Gray and J.R. Kassube. It is significant for its shale gas resources.

== Lithology ==
The Horn River Formation is composed of dark siliceous and calcareous shale, and argillaceous bituminous limestone.

== Stratigraphy ==
The Horn River Formation is included in the Beaverhill Lake Group. It is subdivided into the following members, from top to base:

- Muskwa Member: bituminous, mildly radioactive shale
- Otter Park Member: grey calcareous shale
- Evie Member: black silty limestone

=== Distribution ===
The Horn River Formation is present in the subsurface in northeastern British Columbia and extends to Great Slave Lake in the Northwest Territories, where it outcrops. It reaches a maximum thickness of 320 metres (1,050 ft) in the subsurface of the Fort Nelson area.

=== Relationship to other units ===
The Horn River Formation is overlain by the Fort Simpson Formation and underlain by the limestones of the Lonely Bay Formation, Nahanni Formation or Pine Point Formation. It is equivalent to the Slave Point Formation. In the Northwest Territories it includes the Muskwa Formation, and the Waterways Member of the Hay River Formation. It includes the pinnacle reefs of the Horn Plateau Formation.

== Hydrocarbon production ==
Shale gas is present in the siliceous shales of all three members of the Horn River Formation in northeastern British Columbia, and it is produced in the Greater Sierra oil field north of Fort Nelson. Horizontal drilling and fracturing techniques are used to extract the gas from the low permeability shales. The original-gas-in-place volumes are estimated to be up to 500 Tcf, making it the third largest North American natural gas accumulation discovered prior to 2010. Companies involved in the extraction of natural gas from the Horn River Shale include Ovintiv, EOG Resources, Stone Mountain Resources, ExxonMobil, Quicksilver Resources, and CNOOC Petroleum North America ULC. Horn River gas contains 10-12% CO_{2}, much higher than the 2–4.5% of conventional natural gas. If this gas is processed normally about 500 million tonnes of CO_{2} will be released into the atmosphere.

== Hydraulic fracturing in Canada ==
Massive hydraulic fracturing has been widely used in Alberta since the late 1970s. The method is currently used in development of the Cardium, Duvernay, Montney and Viking formations in Alberta, Bakken formation in Saskatchewan, Montney and Horn River formations in British Columbia.
