= Keg River Formation =

Devonian geologic unit

- Stratigraphic range: Givetian
- Type: Geological formation
- Underlies: Muskeg Formation
- Overlies: Chinchaga Formation
- Thickness: up to 300 metres (980 ft)

Lithology
- Primary: Dolomite, limestone

Location
- Coordinates: 59.1725°N 118.7482°W
- Region: Alberta
- Country: Canada

Type section
- Named for: Keg River
- Named by: J. Law
- Year defined: 1955

The Keg River Formation is a stratigraphic unit of Givetian age in the Western Canada Sedimentary Basin.

== Description ==
It takes the name from the Keg River, a community along the Peace River, and was first described in the California Standard Steen River 2-22-117-5W6M well (situated north of Zama Lake) by J. Law in 1955.

=== Lithology ===
The Keg River Formation is composed of dark dolomite with intercrystalline or vuggy porosity and wackestone limestone. The Rainbow Member and upper Keg River Member are reef formations deposited in the Rainbow, Zama and Bitscho sub-basins.

=== Distribution ===
The Keg River Formation occurs in the subsurface from northeastern to northwestern Alberta and its southern border is defined by the Peace River Arch. It varies in depth from 10 metres (30 ft) to 300 metres (980 ft).

=== Relationship to other units ===
The Keg River Formation is conformably overlain by the Muskeg Formation and unconformably overlays the Chinchaga Formation.

It is equivalent to the Pine Point Formation, Hume Formation and Nahanni Formation in north-eastern British Columbia and the Northwest Territories and to the Winnipegosis Formation in Saskatchewan and eastern Alberta.

== Economic geology ==
=== Petroleum geology ===
Oil is produced from the Keg River reefs in the Zama Lake and Rainbow Lake areas of north-western Alberta.
