= Core sample =

Cylindrical section of (usually) a naturally-occurring substance

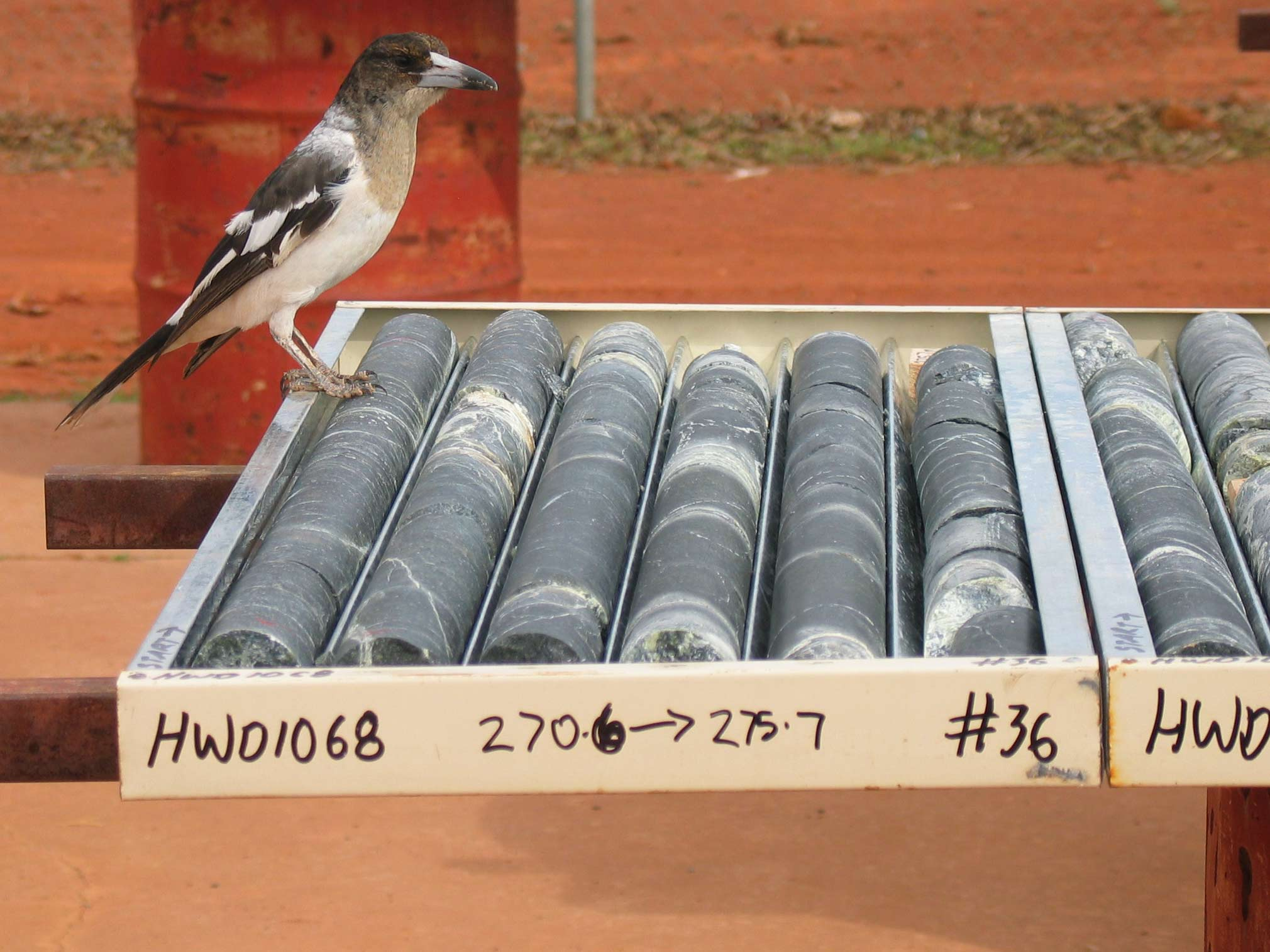
Rock core samples, the product of a diamond rig. A pied butcherbird perches nearby.

A core sample is a cylindrical section of (usually) a naturally occurring substance. Most core samples are obtained by drilling with special drills into the substance, such as sediment or rock, with a hollow steel tube, called a core drill. The hole made for the core sample is called the "core hole". A variety of core samplers exist to sample different media under different conditions; there is continuing development in the technology. In the coring process, the sample is pushed more or less intact into the tube. Removed from the tube in the laboratory, it is inspected and analyzed by different techniques and equipment depending on the type of data desired.

Core samples can be taken to test the properties of manmade materials, such as concrete, ceramics, some metals and alloys, especially the softer ones. Core samples can also be taken of living things, including human beings, especially of a person's bones for microscopic examination to help diagnose diseases.

== Methods ==
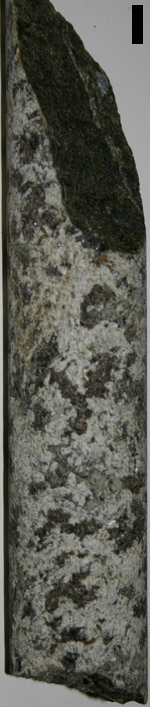
Granitic rock core from Stillwater igneous complex, Montana (from a spoil pile).

The composition of the subject materials can vary from almost liquid to the strongest materials found in nature or technology, and the location of the subject materials can vary from on the laboratory bench to over 10 km from the surface of the Earth in a borehole. The range of equipment and techniques applied to the task is correspondingly great. Core samples are most often taken with their long axis oriented roughly parallel to the axis of a borehole, or parallel to the gravity field for the gravity-driven tools. However it is also possible to take core samples from the wall of an existing borehole. Taking samples from an exposure, be it an overhanging rock face or on a different planet, is almost trivial. (The Mars Exploration Rovers carry a Rock Abrasion Tool, which is logically equivalent to the "rotary sidewall core" tool described below.)

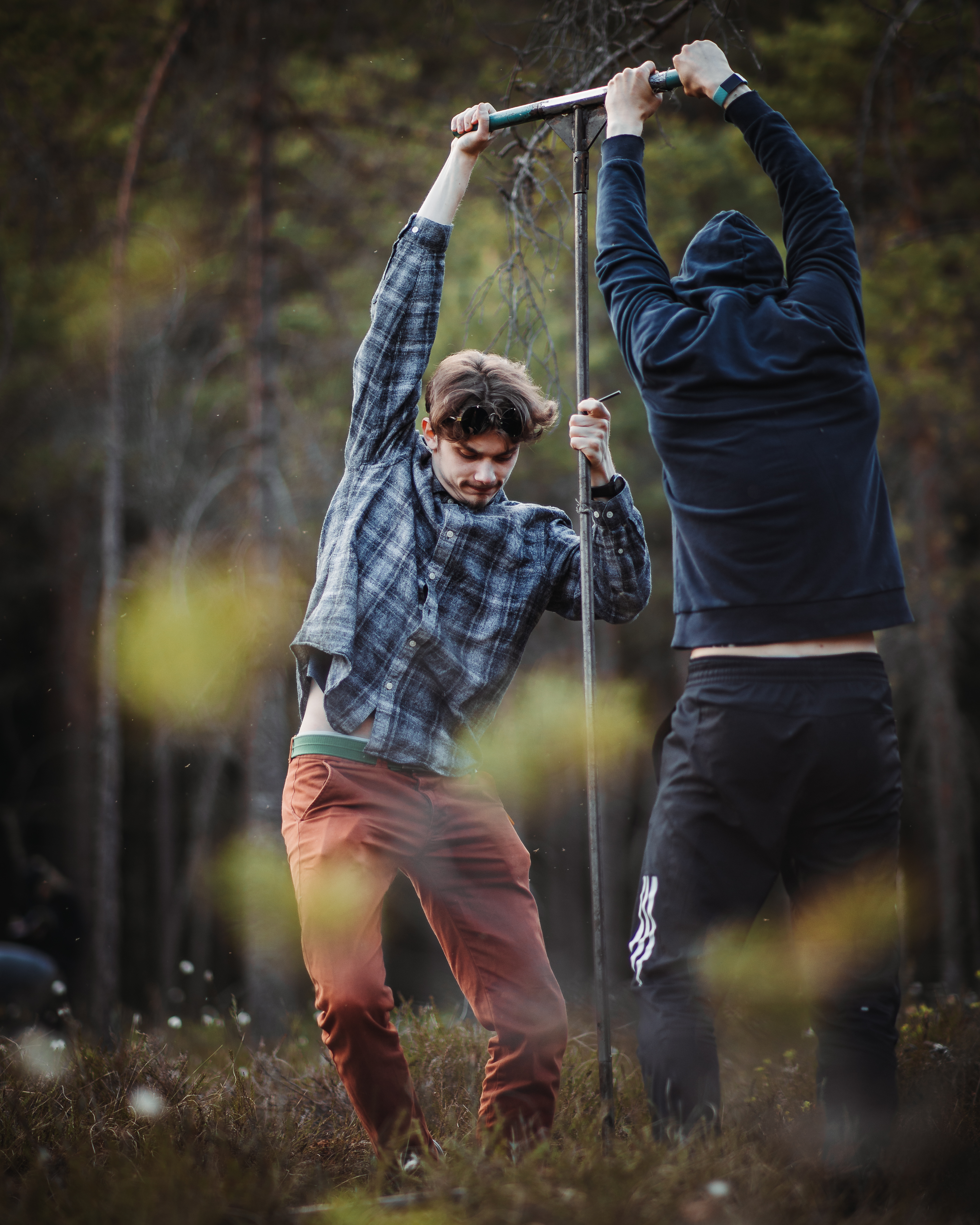
Core sampling by hand in a bog in Estonia (2023)

Some common techniques include:

- Gravity coring, in which the core sampler is dropped into the sample, usually the bed of a water body, but essentially the same technique can also be done on soft materials on land. The penetration forces, if recorded, give information about the strength of different depths in the material, which may be the only information required, with samples as an incidental benefit. This technique is common in both civil engineering site investigations (where the technique shades into pile driving) and geological studies of recent aquatic deposits. The low strength of the materials penetrated means that cores have to be relatively small.
- Vibrating, in which the sampler is vibrated to allow penetration into thixotropic media. Again, the physical strength of the subject material limits the size of the core that can be retrieved.
- Drilling, where a rotating annular tool backed up by a cylindrical core sample storage device is pressed against the subject materials to cut out a cylinder of the subject material. A mechanism is normally needed to retain the cylindrical sample in the coring tool. Depending on circumstances, particularly the consistency and composition of the subject materials, different arrangements may be needed within the core tools to support and protect the sample on its way to the surface; it is often also necessary to control or reduce the contact between the drilling fluid and the core sample, to reduce changes from the coring process. The mechanical forces imposed on the core sample by the tool frequently lead to fracture of the core and loss of less-competent intervals, which can greatly complicate the interpretation of the core. Cores can routinely be cut as small as a few millimeters in diameter (in wood, for dendrochronology) up to over 150 millimeters in diameter (routine in oil exploration). The lengths of samples can range from less than a meter (again, in wood, for dendrochronology) up to around 200 meters in one run, though 27 to 54 meters is more usual (in oil exploration), and many runs can be made in succession if "quick look" analysis in the field suggests that the zone of interest is continuing.
- Percussion sidewall coring uses robust cylindrical "bullets" explosively propelled into the wall of a borehole to retrieve a (relatively) small, short core sample. These tend to be heavily shattered, rendering porosity/permeability measurements dubious, but are often sufficient for lithological and micropaleontological study. Many samples can be attempted in a single run of the tools, which are typically configured with 20 to 30 "bullets" and propulsive charges along the length of a tool. Several tools can often be ganged together for a single run. The success rates for firing a particular bullet, it penetrating the borehole wall, the retention system recovering the bullet from the borehole wall, and the sample is retained in the bullet are all relatively low, so it is not uncommon for only half the samples attempted to be successful. This is an important consideration in planning sample programs.
- Rotary sidewall coring, where a miniaturized automated rotary drilling tool is applied to the side of the borehole to cut a sample similar in size to a percussion sidewall core (described above). These tend to suffer less deformation than percussion cores. However, the core-cutting process takes longer and jams are common in the ancillary equipment which retrieves the sample from the drill bit and stores it within the tool body.
- Coring by hand can be done with a variety of instruments, such as a Russian Peat Corer, a handheld piston corer or simply a hollow tube. The advantages of coring by hand are low costs and quick operation, but a handheld corer will only reach limited depths, ranging from a few decimeters in clay soils to a few meters in soft lake sediments.

== Management of cores and data ==
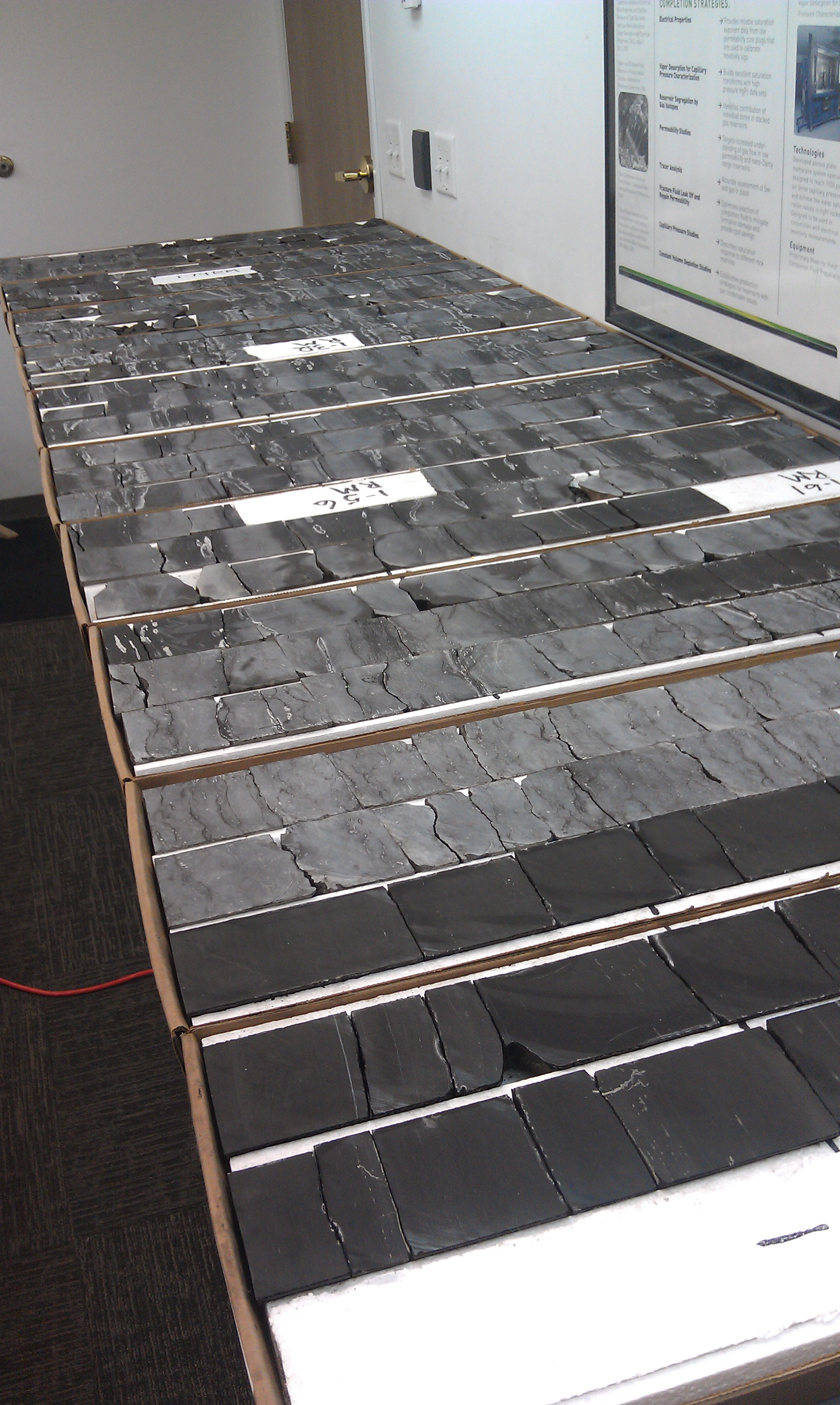
Cut Bakken Core samples

Although often neglected, core samples always degrade to some degree in the process of cutting the core, handling it, and studying it. Non-destructive techniques are increasingly common, e.g., the use of MRI scanning to characterize grains, pore fluids, pore spaces (porosity) and their interactions (constituting part of permeability) but such expensive subtlety is likely wasted on a core that has been shaken on an unsprung lorry for 300 km of dirt road. What happens to cores between the retrieval equipment and the final laboratory (or archive) is an often neglected part of record keeping and core management.

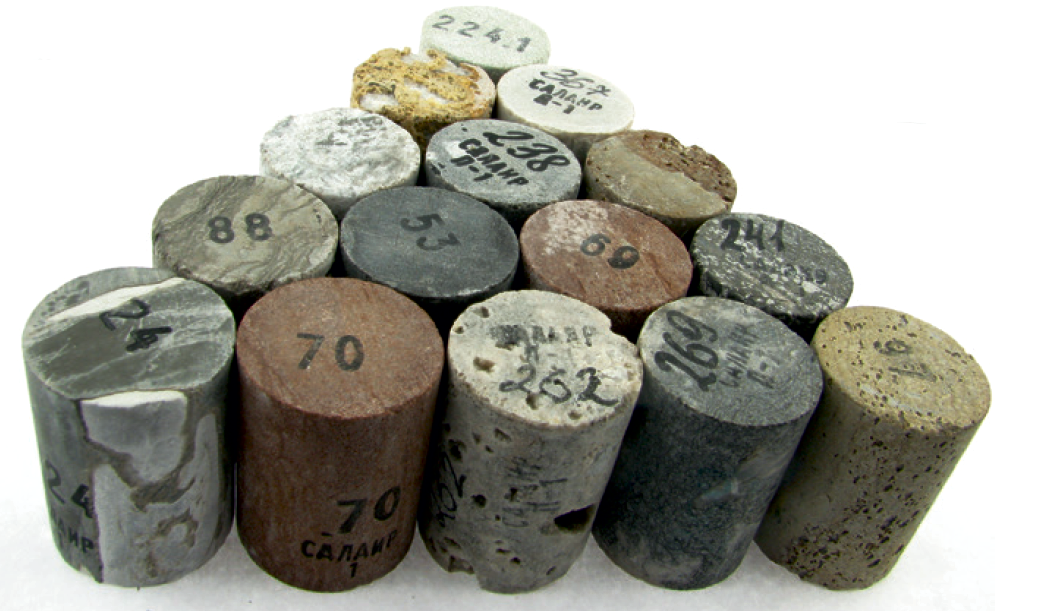
Core samples

Coring has come to be recognized as an important source of data, and more attention and care is being put on preventing damage to the core during various stages of its transportation and analysis. The usual way to do this is to freeze the core completely using liquid nitrogen, which is cheaply sourced. In some cases, special polymers are also used to preserve and seat/cushion the core from damage.

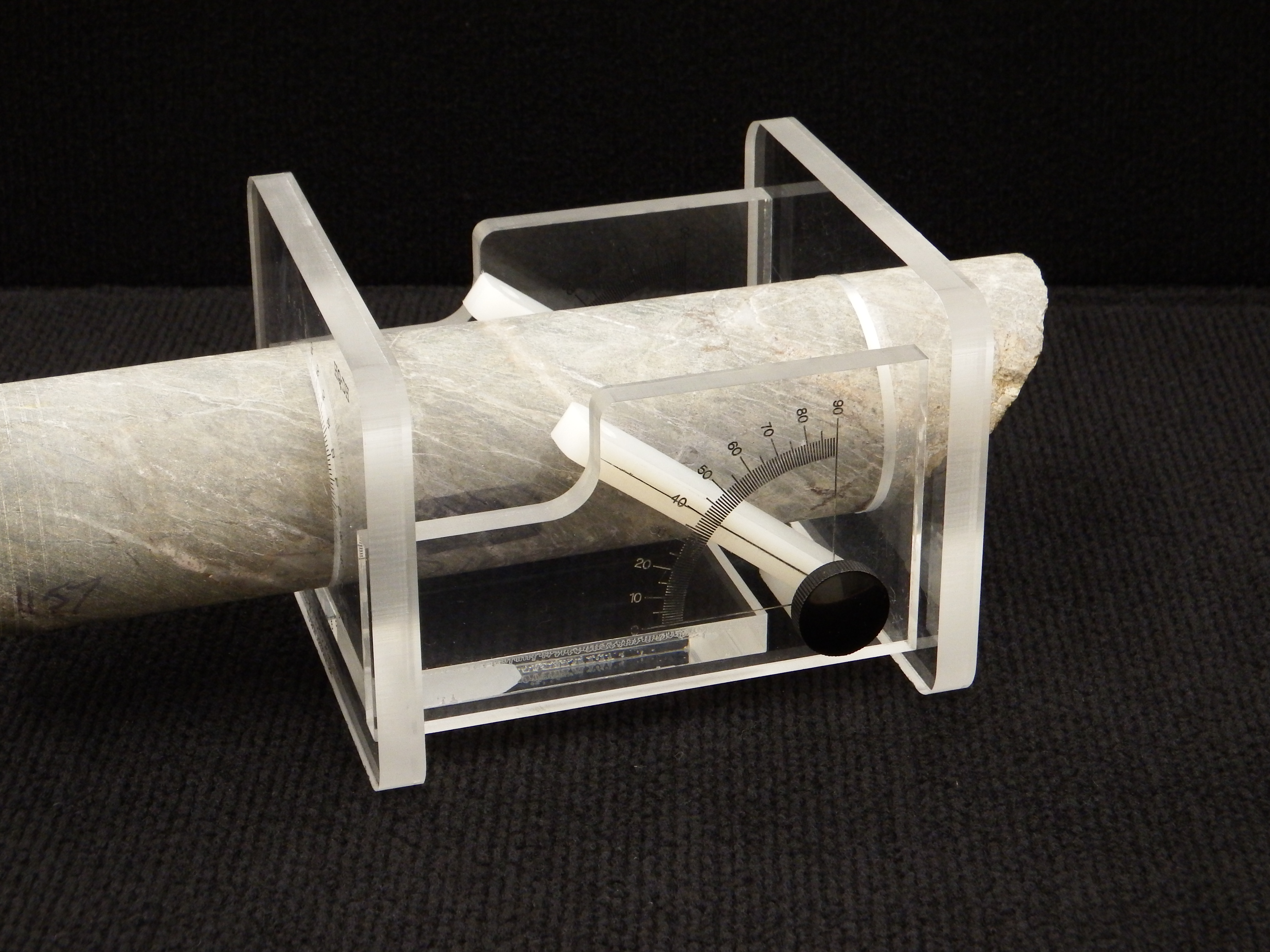
Goniometers are used to measure angles of fractures and other features in a core sample relative to its standard orientation.

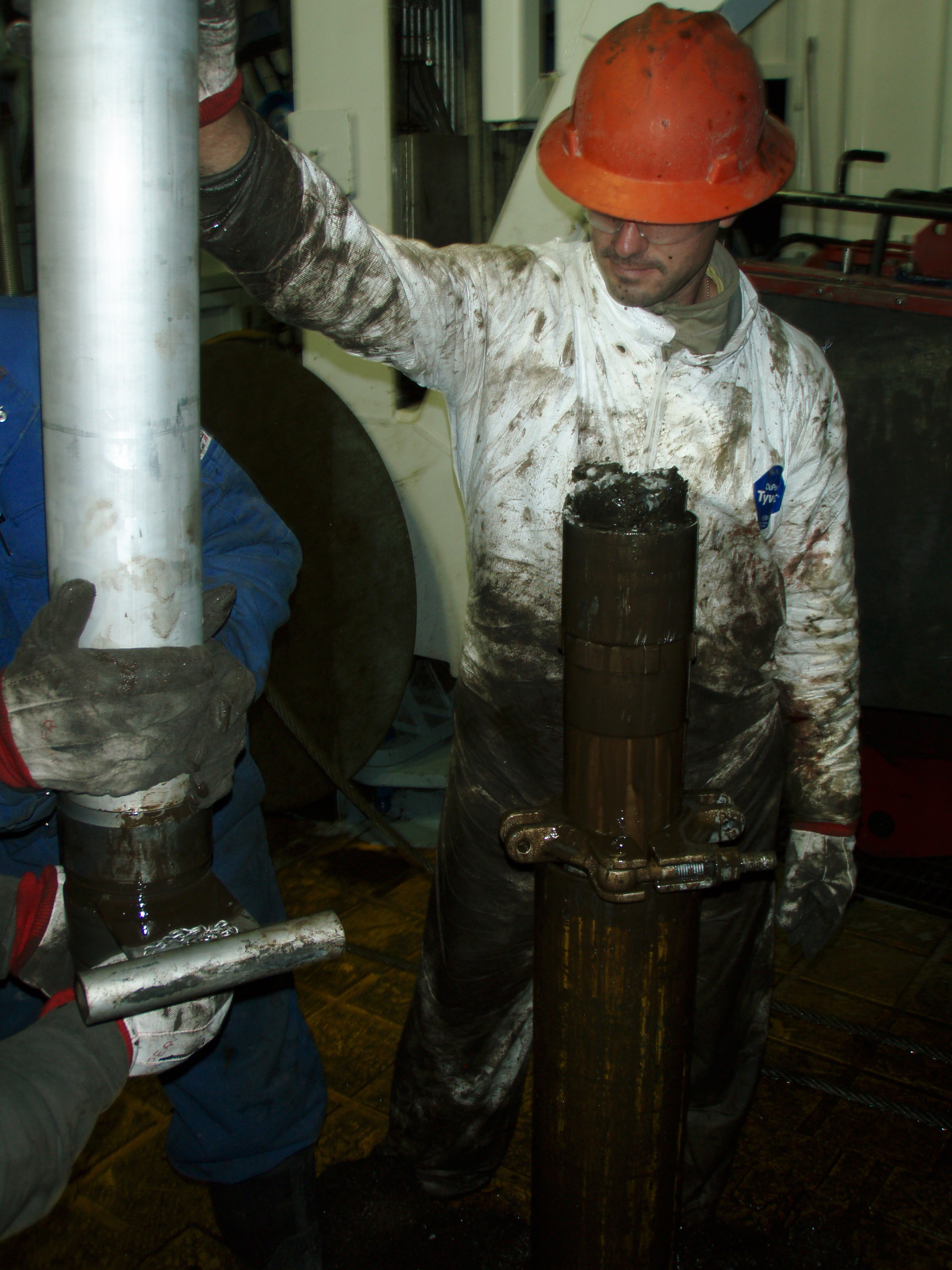
Pulling the Bakken Core out of the core barrell

Equally, a core sample which cannot be related to its context (where it was before it became a core sample) has lost much of its benefit. The identification of the borehole, and the position and orientation ("way up") of the core in the borehole is critical, even if the borehole is in a tree trunk – dendrochronologists always try to include a bark surface in their samples so that the date of most-recent growth of the tree can be unambiguously determined.

If these data become separated from core samples, it is generally impossible to regain that data. The cost of a coring operation can vary from a few currency units (for a hand-caught core from a soft soil section) to tens of millions of currency units (for sidewall cores from a remote-area offshore borehole many kilometres deep). Inadequate recording of such basic data has ruined the utility of both types of core.

Different disciplines have different local conventions of recording these data, and the user should familiarize themselves with their area's conventions. For example, in the oil industry, orientation of the core is typically recorded by marking the core with two longitudinal colour streaks, with the red one on the right when the core is being retrieved and marked at surface. Cores cut for mineral mining may have their own, different, conventions. Civil engineering or soil studies may have their own, different, conventions as their materials are often not competent enough to make permanent marks on.

It is becoming increasingly common to retain core samples in cylindrical packaging which forms part of the core-cutting equipment, and to make the marks of record on these "inner barrels" in the field prior to further processing and analysis in the laboratory. Sometimes core is shipped from the field to the laboratory in as long a length as it comes out of the ground; other times it is cut into standard lengths (5m or 1m or 3 ft) for shipping, then reassembled in the laboratory. Some of the "inner barrel" systems are capable of being reversed on the core sample, so that in the laboratory the sample goes "wrong way up" when the core is reassembled. This can complicate interpretation.

If the borehole has petrophysical measurements made of the wall rocks, and these measurements are repeated along the length of the core then the two data sets correlated, one will almost universally find that the depth "of record" for a particular piece of core differs between the two methods of measurement. Which set of measurements to believe then becomes a matter of policy for the client (in an industrial setting) or of great controversy (in a context without an overriding authority). Recording that there are discrepancies, for whatever reason, retains the possibility of correcting an incorrect decision at a later date; destroying the "incorrect" depth data makes it impossible to correct a mistake later. Any system for retaining and archiving data and core samples needs to be designed so that dissenting opinions like this can be retained.

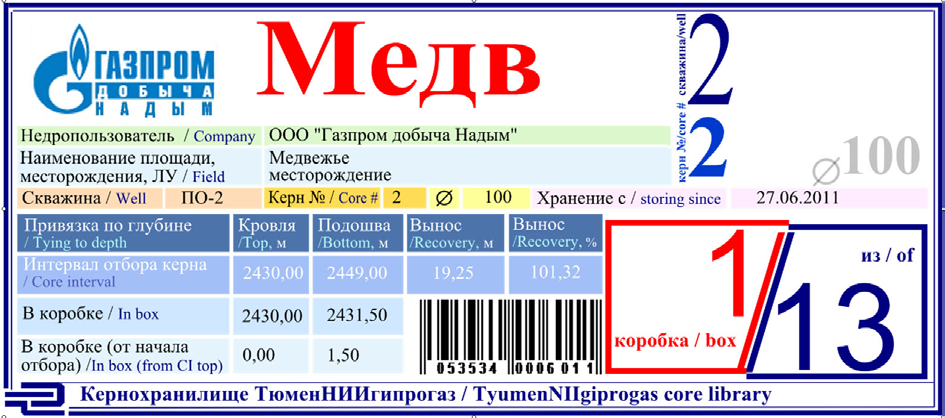
Core box label

If core samples from a campaign are competent, it is common practice to "slab" them – cut the sample into two or more samples longitudinally – quite early in laboratory processing so that one set of samples can be archived early in the analysis sequence as a protection against errors in processing. "Slabbing" the core into a 2/3 and a 1/3 set is common. It is also common for one set to be retained by the main customer while the second set goes to the government (who often impose a condition for such donation as a condition of exploration/ exploitation licensing). "Slabbing" also has the benefit of preparing a flat, smooth surface for examination and testing of profile permeability, which is very much easier to work with than the typically rough, curved surface of core samples when they're fresh from the coring equipment. Photography of raw and "slabbed" core surfaces is routine, often under both natural and ultra-violet light.

A unit of length occasionally used in the literature on seabed cores is cmbsf, an abbreviation for centimeters below sea floor.

== History of coring ==
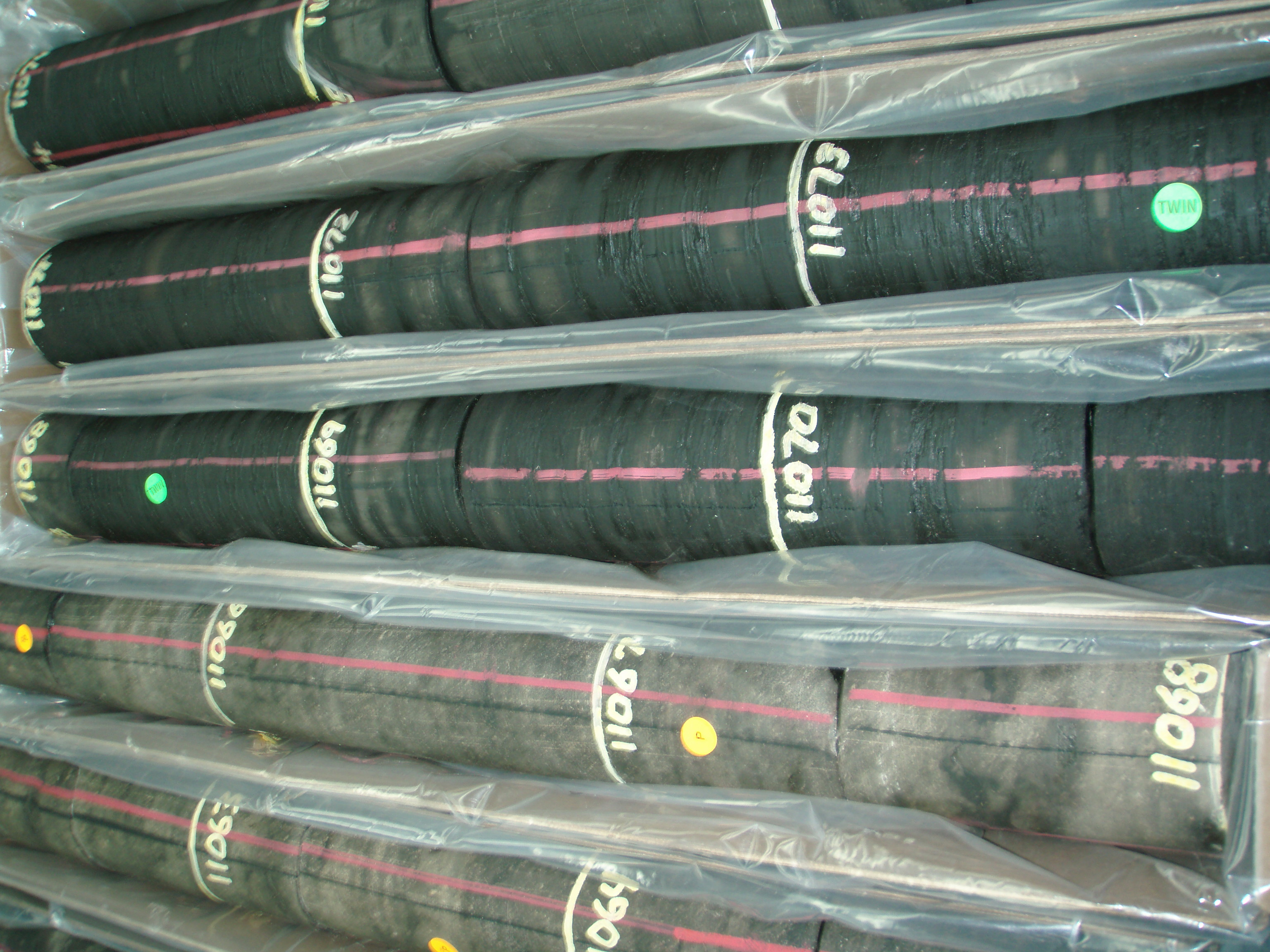
Bakken Core

The technique of coring long predates attempts to drill into the Earth’s mantle by the Deep Sea Drilling Program. The value to oceanic and other geologic history of obtaining cores over a wide area of sea floors soon became apparent. Core sampling by many scientific and exploratory organizations expanded rapidly. To date hundreds of thousands of core samples have been collected from floors of all the planet's oceans and many of its inland waters.

Access to many of these samples is facilitated by the Index to Marine & Lacustrine Geological Samples.

== Informational value of core samples ==
Coring began as a method of sampling surroundings of ore deposits and oil exploration. It soon expanded to oceans, lakes, ice, mud, soil and wood. Cores on very old trees give information about their growth rings without destroying the tree.

Cores indicate variations of climate, species and sedimentary composition during geologic history. The dynamic phenomena of the Earth's surface are for the most part cyclical in a number of ways, especially temperature and rainfall.

There are many ways to date a core. Once dated, it gives valuable information about changes of climate and terrain. For example, cores in the ocean floor, soil and ice have altered the view of the geologic history of the Pleistocene entirely.

== Alternatives ==
Reverse circulation drilling is a method in which rock cuttings are continuously extracted through the hollow drill rod and can be sampled for analysis. The method may be faster and use less water than core drilling, but does not produce cores of relatively undisturbed material, so less information on the rock structure can be derived from analysis. If compressed air is used for cutting extraction the sample remains uncontaminated, is available almost immediately, and the method has a low environmental impact.

== See also ==
- Core drill
- Ice core
- Integrated Ocean Drilling Program
- Scientific drilling
