= Stoddart Group =

Geological sedimentary stratum

- Stratigraphic range: Mississippian to Pennsylvanian
- Type: Geological group
- Sub-units: Taylor Flat Formation; Kiskatinaw Formation; Golata Formation
- Underlies: Ishbel Group, Prophet Formation
- Overlies: Debolt Formation
- Thickness: up to 660 metres (2,170 ft)

Lithology
- Primary: Limestone, sandstone, shale
- Other: Dolomite, siltstone, coal, anhydrite

Location
- Coordinates: 56.219°N 120.800°W
- Region: Alberta
- Country: Canada

Type section
- Named for: Stoddart Creek
- Named by: A.T.C. Rutgers, 1958.

The Stoddart Group is a stratigraphic unit of Mississippian to Early Pennsylvanian age in the Western Canadian Sedimentary Basin.

It takes the name from the Stoddart Creek, a creek that flows into Charlie Lake north of Fort St. John, and was first described in well Pacific Fort St. John #23 (at depths from 2000 to 2600m) by A.T.C. Rutgers in 1958.

== Lithology ==
The Formation is composed of both carbonate and clastic facies.

== Distribution ==
The Stoddart Group reaches a maximum thickness of 660 metres (2,170 ft) in the sub-surface north of Fort St. John in north-eastern British Columbia. It is present in the sub-surface from the foothills of the Northern Rockies and eastwards into the Peace River Country in north-western Alberta.

== Subdivisions ==
The Stoddart Group is composed of the following formations, from top to bottom:

Sub-unit	Age	Lithology	Max. thickness	Reference
Taylor Flat Formation	Early Pennsylvanian	limestone, dolomite, occasional sandstone, calcareous shale	152 m (500 ft)	
Kiskatinaw Formation	Chesterian	quartzose sandstone, dark grey shale, rare carbonate	183 m (600 ft)	
Golata Formation	late Meramecian-Chesterian	fossiliferous limestone, shales, occasional siltstone, coal and anhydrite	50 m (160 ft)	

== Relationship to other units ==
The Stoddart Group is overlain by the Ishbel Group in the foothills and the Prophet Formation in the northern plains; it conformably overlays the Debolt Formation.

It can be correlated with the Tunnel Mountain Formation, the Kananaskis Formation, the Mattson Formation and the Mount Head Formation of the southern Canadian Rockies, and with the Amsden Formation in Montana.
