= Belloy =

Belloy may refer to:

== People ==
- Jean-Baptiste de Belloy, Archbishop of Paris from 1802 to 1808
- Pierre-Laurent Buirette de Belloy, a French dramatist and actor

== Places ==
- Belloy-en-Santerre, a commune of the Somme département, in France
- Belloy-Saint-Léonard, a commune of the Somme département, in France
- Belloy-sur-Somme, a commune of the Somme département, in France
- Belloy, Oise, a commune of the Oise département, in France
- Belloy, Alberta, a hamlet in Alberta, Canada

== Other ==
- Belloy Formation, a stratigraphical unit in the Western Canadian Sedimentary Basin
