= Spray Lakes Group =

- Stratigraphic range: Pennsylvanian
- Type: Group
- Sub-units: Kananaskis Formation; Tunnel Mountain Formation
- Underlies: Ishbel Group
- Overlies: Rundle Group
- Thickness: More than 600 metres (2000 ft)

Lithology
- Primary: dolomite, limestone
- Other: Sandstone, quartzite, chert

Location
- Coordinates: 50°48′24.1″N 115°15′47.9″W
- Region: Alberta
- Country: Canada

Type section
- Named for: Spray Lakes, Alberta
- Named by: A. McGugan and J.E. Rapson, 1963

The Spray Lakes Group is a stratigraphic unit that is present on the western edge of the Western Canada Sedimentary Basin in the southern Canadian Rockies, and it comprises the Pennsylvanian-age strata of that region. It was named after the Spray Lakes near Banff, Alberta, and fossils of marine invertebrates are found in some of its strata.

== Stratigraphy and lithology ==
The Spray Lakes Group comprises the quartzose sandstones of the Tunnel Mountain Formation and its equivalents in the lower part, and the dolomites and limestones of the Kananaskis Formation in the upper part. It is unconformably overlain by the Permian-age strata of the Ishbel Group, and underlain by the Late Mississippian strata of the Rundle Group.

== Thickness and distribution ==
The Spray Lakes Group is present in the southern Canadian Rockies and reaches a maximum thickness of more than 600 metres (2000 feet) in the westernmost front ranges.
