= List of fossiliferous stratigraphic units in Alberta =

This is a list of fossiliferous stratigraphic units in Alberta, Canada.

Group or formation	Period	Stage	Dominant lithology	Depositional environment
Alberta Group/Waipiabi Formation	Late Cretaceous	Cenomanian to Santonian	shale	marine
Alexo Formation	Late Devonian	Frasnian to Famennian	dolomitic limestone	marine
Bad Heart Formation	Late Cretaceous	Turonian	shale	marine
Banff Formation	Mississippian	Tournasian	limestone	marine
Battle Formation (Edmonton Group)	Late Cretaceous	Maastrichtian	mudstone	nonmarine
Bearpaw Formation (Edmonton Group)	Late Cretaceous Campanian	Campanian	shale	marine
Beaverfoot Formation	Ordovician to Silurian	Ashgillian to Llandoverian	dolomite	marine
Beaverhill Lake Group	Devonian	late Givetian to early Frasnian	limestone	marine
Beaverhill Lake Group/Slave Point Formation	Late Devonian	Frasnian	limestone	marine
Beaverhill Lake Group/Waterways Formation	Middle Devonian to Late Devonian	late Givetian to Frasnian	limestone, calcareous shale	marine
Belcourt Formation	Early Permian	Asselian to Sakmarian	dolomite, limestone	marine
Belle Fourche Formation (Colorado Group)	Cretaceous	Cenomanian	shale	marine
Belloy Formation	Permian	Artinskian to Roadian	dolomite, sandstone	marine
Belly River Formation (Judith River Formation)	Late Cretaceous	Campanian	sandstone, siltstone	nonmarine
Belly River Group/Allison Formation	Late Cretaceous	Campanian	sandstone, siltstone	nonmarine
Belly River Group/Dinosaur Park Formation	Late Cretaceous	Campanian	sandstone, siltstone	nonmarine
Belly River Group/Foremost Formation	Late Cretaceous	Campanian	sandstone, siltstone	nonmarine
Belly River Group/Oldman Formation	Late Cretaceous	Campanian	sandstone, siltstone	nonmarine
Bison Creek Formation	Late Cambrian		shale	marine
Blackstone Formation	Late Cretaceous	Cenomanian to Turonian	shale	marine
Blairmore Group/Luscar Group	Early Cretaceous	Aptian to Albian	sandstone, siltstone	nonmarine
Blood Reserve Formation	Late Cretaceous	Campanian	sandstone	nonmarine
Brazeau Formation	Late Cretaceous	Campanian to Maastrichtian	sandstone, siltstone	nonmarine
Burgess Shale Formation (Stephen Formation)	Middle Cambrian		shale	marine
Cadomin Formation	Early Cretaceous	Barremian to Aptian	conglomerate, sandstone	nonmarine
Cairn Formation	Late Devonian	Frasnian	calcareous dolomite	marine
Cardium Formation (Colorado Group)	Late Cretaceous	Turonian to Coniacian	sandstone, siltstone	marine
Clearwater Formation (Mannville Group)	Early Cretaceous	Albian	shale	marine
Coalspur Formation	Late Cretaceous to Paleocene	Maastrichtian to Danian	sandstone, siltstone, coal	nonmarine
Colorado Group/Belle Fourche Formation	Cretaceous	Cenomanian	shale	marine
Colorado Group/Cardium Formation	Late Cretaceous	Turonian to Coniacian	sandstone, siltstone	marine
Colorado Group/Second White Speckled Shale	Late Cretaceous	Cenomanian to Turonian	shale	marine
Colorado Group/Westgate Formation	Late Cretaceous	Turonian	shale	marine
Cooking Lake Formation	Late Devonian	Frasnian	limestone	marine
Deadwood Formation	Middle to Late Cambrian		sandstone	marine
Dessa Dawn Formation (obsolete)	Mississippian		limestone	marine
Dinosaur Park Formation (Belly River Group) (Judith River Group)	Late Cretaceous	Campanian	sandstone, siltstone	nonmarine
Dunvegan Formation	Late Cretaceous	Cenomanian	sandstone, siltstone	nonmarine
Duvernay Formation	Late Devonian	Frasnian	bituminous limestone, argillaceous limestone	marine
Edmonton Group	Late Cretaceous to early Paleocene	Campanian to Danian	sandstone, siltstone	nonmarine
Edmonton Group/Battle Formation	Late Cretaceous	Maastrichtian	mudstone	nonmarine
Edmonton Group/Horseshoe Canyon Formation	Late Cretaceous	Campanian to early Maastrichtian	sandstone, siltstone, coal	nonmarine
Edmonton Group/Scollard Formation	Late Cretaceous to early Paleocene	Maastrichtian to Danian	sandstone, siltstone, coal	nonmarine
Edmonton Group/Whitemud Formation	Late Cretaceous	Maastrichtian	sandstone, siltstone, claystone	nonmarine
Etherington Formation	Mississippian	Serpukhovian	dolomitic limestone	marine
Exshaw Formation	Late Devonian to Early Mississippian	late Famennian to middle Tournasian	shale	marine
Fairholme Group	Late Devonian	Frasnian	dolomite	marine
Fairholme Group/Mount Hawk Formation	Devonian	Frasnian	dolomite	marine
Fernie Formation	Jurassic	Hettangian to middle Tithonian	shale, siltstone	marine
Flume Formation	Late Devonian	Frasnian	dolomite	marine
Foremost Formation (Belly River Group)	Late Cretaceous	Campanian	sandstone, siltstone	nonmarine
Fort St. John Group	Cretaceous	Albian to Cenomanian	sandstone, siltstone, shale	nonmarine and marine
Fort St. John Group/Shaftesbury Formation	Cretaceous	Albian to Cenomanian	shale	marine
Gates Formation	Early Cretaceous	Albian	sandstone, siltstone, coal	nonmarine
Ghost River Formation (obsolete)	Cambrian to Middle Devonian			
Gog Group	Early Cambrian		quartzose sandstone, conglomerate	
Grand Rapids Formation (Mannville Group)	Early Cretaceous	Albian	sandstone, siltstone	nonmarine
Hasler Formation	Early Cretaceous	Albian	shale	marine
Horseshoe Canyon Formation (Edmonton Group)	Late Cretaceous	Campanian to early Maastrichtian	sandstone, siltstone, coal	nonmarine
Ireton Formation	Late Devonian	Frasnian	shale	marine
Judith River Formation (Belly River Formation)	Late Cretaceous	Campanian	sandstone, siltstone	nonmarine
Judith River Group/Dinosaur Park Formation	Late Cretaceous	Campanian	sandstone, siltstone	nonmarine
Kananaskis Formation	Late Carboniferous	Late Pennsylvanian	limestone, dolomite, chert	marine
Kaskapau Formation	Late Cretaceous	Cenomanian to Turonian	shale	marine
Lea Park Formation	Late Cretaceous	Campanian	shale	marine
Leduc Formation	Late Devonian	Frasnian	dolomite	marine
Livingstone Formation (Rundle Group)	Mississippian	Tournasian to Visean	dolomitic limestone	marine
Loon River Formation (obsolete)	Early Cretaceous	Albian	shale	marine
Lyell Formation	Late Cambrian	Dresbachian	limestone, dolomite	marine
Mannville Group	Early Cretaceous	Barremian to Albian	sandstone, siltstone, shale	nonmarine and marine
Mannville Group/Clearwater Formation	Early Cretaceous	Albian	shale	marine
Mannville Group/Grand Rapids Formation	Early Cretaceous	Albian	sandstone, siltstone	nonmarine
Mannville Group/McMurray Formation	Early Cretaceous	late Barremian to Aptian	sandstone, siltstone	nonmarine, marginal marine
McMurray Formation (Mannville Group)	Early Cretaceous	late Barremian to Aptian	sandstone, siltstone	nonmarine, marginal marine
Mikkwa Formation	Middle Devonian	Givetian	dolomitic limestone	marine
Milk River Formation	Late Cretaceous	Santonian to Campanian	sandstone, siltstone	nonmarine
Mistaya Formation	Late Cambrian		limestone	marine
Montney Formation	Early Triassic	Olenekian	siltstone, shale	marine
Mount Hawk Formation (Fairholme Group)	Late Devonian	Frasnian to Famennian	dolomite, limestone	marine
Mount Head Formation (Rundle Group)	Mississippian	Visean	dolomitic limestone	marine
Mowitch Formation	Permian	Guadalupian	sandstone, calcareous sandstone	marine
Mural Formation	Early Cambrian		limestone, dolomite	marine
Nikanassin Formation	Late Jurassic to Early Cretaceous	Portlandian to Barremian	sandstone, siltstone	nonmarine
Nisku Formation	Late Devonian	Frasnian	dolomite	marine
Nordegg Formation (Fernie Group)	Jurassic		limestone	marine
Norquay Formation (obsolete)	Permian			
Oldman Formation (Belly River Group)	Late Cretaceous	Campanian	sandstone, siltstone	nonmarine
Outram Formation	Early Ordovician		limestone, shale	marine
Pakowki Formation	Late Cretaceous	Campanian	shale, siltstone	marine
Palliser Formation	Late Devonian	Famennian	limestone	marine
Paskapoo Formation	late Paleocene	Thanetian	sandstone, siltstone	nonmarine
Peace River Formation	Early Cretaceous	Albian	sandstone, siltstone, shale	marine and nonmarine
Peechee Formation	late Devonian	Frasnian	dolomite, calcareous dolomite	marine
Perdrix Formation	Late Devonian	Frasnian	calcareous shale	marine
Porcupine Hills Formation	late Paleocene	Danian	sandstone, siltstone, shale	nonmarine
Puskwaskau Formation	Late Cretaceous	Santonian to Campanian	shale	marine
Ranger Canyon Formation	Permian	Guadalupian to Lopingian	sandstone, dolomite	marine
Rocky Mountain Group	Permian		dolomite, sandstone	marine
Rundle Group/Etherington Formation	Mississippian	Serpukhovian	dolomitic limestone	marine
Rundle Group/Livingstone Formation	Mississippian	Tournasian to Visean	dolomitic limestone	marine
Rundle Group/Mount Head Formation	Mississippian	Visean	dolomitic limestone	marine
Rundle Group/Tunnel Mountain Formation	Mississippian		sandstone, dolomitic sandstone	marine
Scollard Formation (Edmonton Group)	Late Cretaceous to early Paleocene	Maastrichtian to Danian	sandstone, siltstone, coal	nonmarine
Second White Speckled Shale (Colorado Group)	Late Cretaceous	Cenomanian to Turonian	shale	marine
Shaftesbury Formation	Cretaceous	Albian to Cenomanian	shale	marine
Simla Formation	Late Devonian	Frasnian	siltstone, dolomitic limestone	marine
Skoki Formation	Middle Ordovician		dolomite	marine
Slave Point Formation (Beaverhill Lake Group)	Middle Devonian	Givetian	limestone	marine
Smoky Group/Bad Heart Formation	Late Cretaceous	Turonian	shale	marine
Smoky Group/Kaskapau Formation	Late Cretaceous	Cenomanian to Turonian	shale	marine
Southesk Formation	Late Devonian	Frasnian	dolomite	marine
Spray River Formation	Triassic		siltstone, shale, dolomite	marine and nonmarine
St. Mary River Formation	Late Cretaceous	Campanian to Maastrichtian	sandstone, siltstone	nonmarine
Stephen Formation	Middle Cambrian		shale	marine
Sulphur Mountain Formation	Triassic		siltstone, dolomite, shale	marine
Survey Peak Formation	Late Cambrian to Early Ordovician		calcareous shale, limestone	marine
Swan Hills Formation	Middle Devonian	late Givetian	limestone	marine
Tunnel Mountain Formation (Rundle Group)	Mississippian		sandstone, dolomitic sandstone	marine
Two Medicine Formation	Late Cretaceous	Campanian	claystone, sandstone	nonmarine
Wabamun Formation	Late Devonian	Famennian	limestone, dolomite	marine
Wapiabi Formation	Late Cretaceous	Coniacian to Campanian	shale, siltstone	marine
Wapiti Formation	Late Cretaceous	Campanian to Maastrichtian	sandstone, siltstone	nonmarine
Waterways Formation (Beaverhill Lake Group)	Middle Devonian to Late Devonian	late Givetian to Frasnian	limestone, calcareous shale	marine
Westgate Formation (Colorado Group)	Late Cretaceous	Turonian	shale	marine
Whitemud Formation (Edmonton Group)	Late Cretaceous	Maastrichtian	sandstone, claystone	nonmarine
Willow Creek Formation	Late Cretaceous	Maastrichtian to Paleocene	sandstone, siltstone	nonmarine
Woodbend Group/Duvernay Formation	Late Devonian	Frasnian	bituminous limestone, argillaceous limestone	marine
Woodbend Group/Leduc Formation	Late Devonian	Frasnian	dolomite	marine
Yahatinda Formation	Middle Devonian	Givetian	dolomitic sandstone, conglomerate, mudstone	nonmarine and marine
