= Kiskatinaw Formation =

Stratigraphical unit in Canada

- Stratigraphic range: Chesteran
- Type: Geological formation
- Unit of: Stoddart Group
- Underlies: Taylor Flat Formation
- Overlies: Golata Formation
- Thickness: up to 300 metres (980 ft)

Lithology
- Primary: Sandstone
- Other: Shale, carbonate beds

Location
- Coordinates: 56.2187°N 120.7998°W
- Region: British Columbia, Alberta
- Country: Canada

Type section
- Named for: Kiskatinaw River
- Named by: H.L. Halbertsma, 1959

The Kiskatinaw Formation is a stratigraphical unit of Mississippian age in the Western Canadian Sedimentary Basin.

It takes the name from the Kiskatinaw River, and was first described in the Pacific Fort St. John No. 23 well (from 2302 to 2598 m) by H.L. Halbertsma in 1959. Kiskatinaw means "cutbank" in Cree.

== Lithology ==
The Kiskatinaw Formation is composed mostly of quartz sandstone at the base, and shale with thin tight sandstone toward the top. In western Alberta it was deposited as a deltaic channel fill. Westwards it was deposited in a marine environment. Beach and near shore sediments can be found in north-eastern British Columbia, and the formation becomes transgressive at the top.

== Distribution ==
The Kiskatinaw Formation occurs in north-eastern British Columbia and in the west of northern Alberta. It has a thickness of 183 metres (600 ft) in the Peace River region and reaches more than 300 metres (980 ft) in the Fort St. John area.

== Relationship to other units ==
The Kiskatinaw Formation is generally conformably overlain by the Taylor Flat Formation (with some exceptions in the Peace River and Fort St. John areas) and unconformably underlain by Golata Formation due to pre-Kiskatinaw erosion. Some Kiskatinaw channels cut down into the Debolt Formation in the eastern parts of its extents. The Kiskatinaw Formation is correlated with the upper Mattson Formation in the Liard area, with the upper Etherington Formation in southern Alberta and with the Otter Formation in Montana.
