= Rundle Stone =

Runnel Stone may refer to:

- Rundle Rock, a quarried building material
- An alternate spelling of Runnel Stone
