= Belge =

Belge may refer to:

- Belge, a Turkish publishing house founded by Ayşe Nur Zarakolu and Ragıp Zarakolu
- belge, the French word for Belgian
- Le Belge (locomotive), first steam locomotive manufactured in Belgium

== People ==
- Burhan Belge (1899-1967), Turkish politician and diplomat
- Murat Belge (born 1943), Turkish academic, translator, writer, and civil rights activist
- Tavie Belge (1894-1965), Belgian singer and actress
