= Tunnel Mountain Formation =

Geologic formation in Alberta, Canada

- Stratigraphic range: Early Pennsylvanian
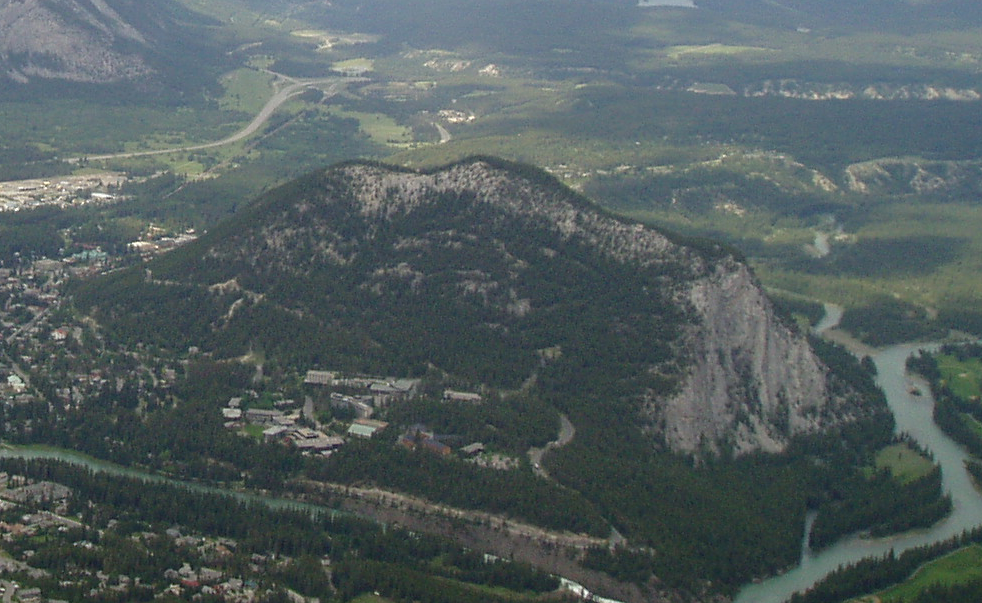
- Tunnel Mountain in Banff, the namesake of the formation
- Type: Formation
- Unit of: Spray Lakes Group
- Sub-units: Tobermory; Storelk; Tyrwhitt
- Underlies: Kananaskis Formation, Ishbel Group
- Overlies: Etherington Formation
- Thickness: up to about 200 metres (600 ft)

Lithology
- Primary: Sandstone
- Other: dolomite, quartzite

Location
- Region: Alberta
- Country: Canada

Type section
- Named for: Tunnel Mountain
- Named by: F.W. Beales, 1950

The Tunnel Mountain Formation is a geologic formation that is present on the western edge of the Western Canada Sedimentary Basin in the Canadian Rockies of western Alberta. Named after Tunnel Mountain near Banff, it was deposited during the Early Pennsylvanian sub-period of the Carboniferous period.

== Lithology and stratigraphy ==
The Tunnel Mountain Formation consists of quartzose sandstone, interbedded with lesser amounts of dolomite, dolomitic sandstone in the lower part, and minor beds of quartzite in the upper part. In areas where they can be differentiated, the formation is subdivided into the three formations shown below in ascending order. Where they cannot be differentiated, the name Tunnel Mountain Formation is applied to the entire sequence.

- Tobermory Formation: quartz-chert sandstone, very fine- to fine-grained, quartz and dolomite cement; rare cross-bedding; minor interbeds of sandy dolomite.
- Storelk Formation: quartz-chert sandstone, very fine- to coarse-grained, quartz cement, typically massive, very rare cross-bedding.
- Tyrwhitt Formation: quartz-chert sandstone, very fine- to fine-grained, quartz and dolomite cement, rare cross-bedding; minor interbeds of sandy dolomite.

== Paleontology ==
The dolomite beds of the Tunnel Mountain sequence include scattered brachiopods and foraminifera.

== Thickness, distribution, and relationship to other units ==
The Tunnel Mountain Formation is present in the front ranges of the Canadian Rockies of western Alberta, and reaches a maximum thickness of about 200 metres (600 ft). It unconformably overlies the Etherington Formation or the Todhunter Formation of the Mississippian Rundle Group, and is conformably overlain by the Late Pennsylvanian Kananaskis Formation. In areas where the Kananaskis is not present, it is unconformably overlain by the Permian Ishbel Group.

== See also ==
- List of fossiliferous stratigraphic units in Alberta
