= Norquay Formation =

Geologic formation in Canada

- Stratigraphic range: Permian
- Type: Formation

Location
- Region: Alberta
- Country: Canada

The Norquay Formation is a geologic formation in Alberta. It preserves fossils dating back to the Permian period.

== See also ==
- List of fossiliferous stratigraphic units in Alberta
