= Tavie Belge =

Belgian singer and actress (1894–1965)

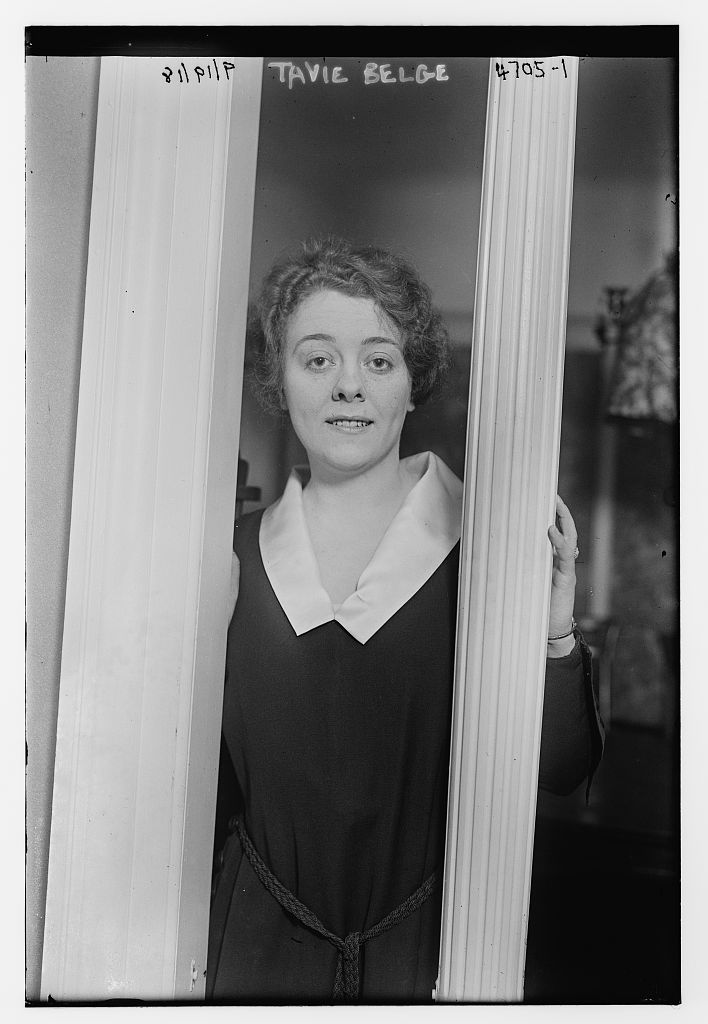
- Born: Octavie Belloy; March 12 1894
- Died: May 13, 1965

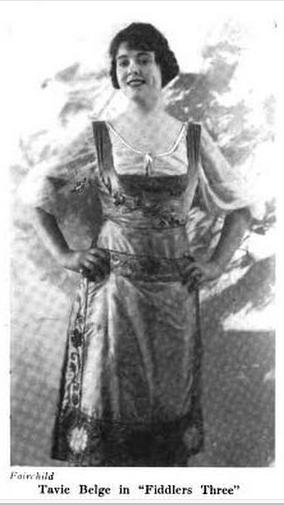
Tavie Belge, from a 1919 publication.

Tavie Belge (March 12, 1894 – May 13, 1965) was the American stage name of Belgian singer and actress Octavie Belloy.

== Early life ==
Octavie Belloy was born into an artistic family in the Borgerhout district of Antwerp. She was the daughter of Petrus Franciscus Belloy, a dancer, and Maria Van Leemput. She was working in theatre from age six, and studied voice in Antwerp. At sixteen, Octavie Belloy was appearing with the Royal Flemish Opera.

Belloy left Belgium on foot as a refugee during World War I. Upon arrival in London, she experienced temporary paralysis, which she described as a reaction to the shock of the experience.

== In America ==
She gave many concerts for war relief causes during World War I, in England, Canada, and the United States. In 1918 she appeared as "Tavie Belge" in the Broadway operetta Fiddlers Three. She was described as having "a rich dramatic soprano of fine range, of wonderfully even quality and tone."

== Later life ==
In 1919, Tavie Belge married her childhood friend, Marechal Emile P. Hendrickx, after they met again in New York, while he was secretary of the Belgian War Mission to the United States. They had a son together, Reginald. Emile owned a hotel in Antwerp, and Octavie resumed her work with the Royal Flemish Opera. She also made several recordings in Belgium in the 1920s. She retired from singing by 1926, but continued in the employ of the Opera until 1935. She was widowed in 1944. and died in 1965, aged 71 years. Her papers are archived at the Letterenhuis.

== Belloy, Alberta ==
There was a rail station and community at Belloy, Alberta, named for Octavie Belloy, in gratitude for her singing to soldiers and for war relief causes. The nearby geological feature, the Belloy Formation, was named for the place.
