= Vermilion Lakes =

Group of lakes in Alberta, Canada

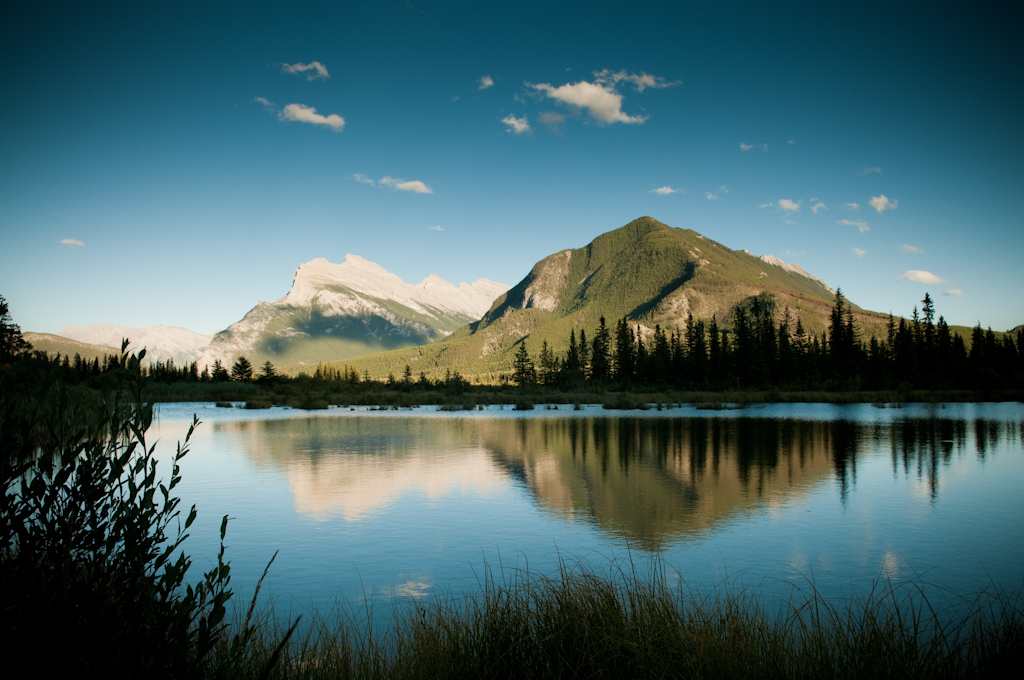
- Mount Rundle and Sulphur Mountain reflected in the lakes

- Location within Alberta
- Location: Banff National Park, near Banff, Alberta
- Coordinates: 51°10′41″N 115°35′56″W
- Primary inflows: Bow River
- Primary outflows: Bow River
- Basin countries: Canada
- Surface area: 0.48 km^{2} (0.19 sq mi)

The Vermilion Lakes are a series of lakes located immediately west of Banff, Alberta, in the Canadian Rocky Mountains.

The three lakes are formed in the Bow River valley, in the Banff National Park, at the foot of Mount Norquay. They are located between the Trans-Canada Highway and the Canadian Pacific Railway tracks. A hot spring is found at the third lake.

== History ==
Archeological evidence proves human activity around the lakes dating back 10,800 years. The site was excavated by Parks Canada's Daryl Fedje, and found remains of campsites and obsidian tools.

== Activities ==
Activities on and around the lakes include canoeing, kayaking, standup paddleboarding, wildlife watching, birdwatching, and hiking. The shorelines along Vermilion Lakes Drive are popular locations for sunrise and sunset photography.

== Image gallery ==
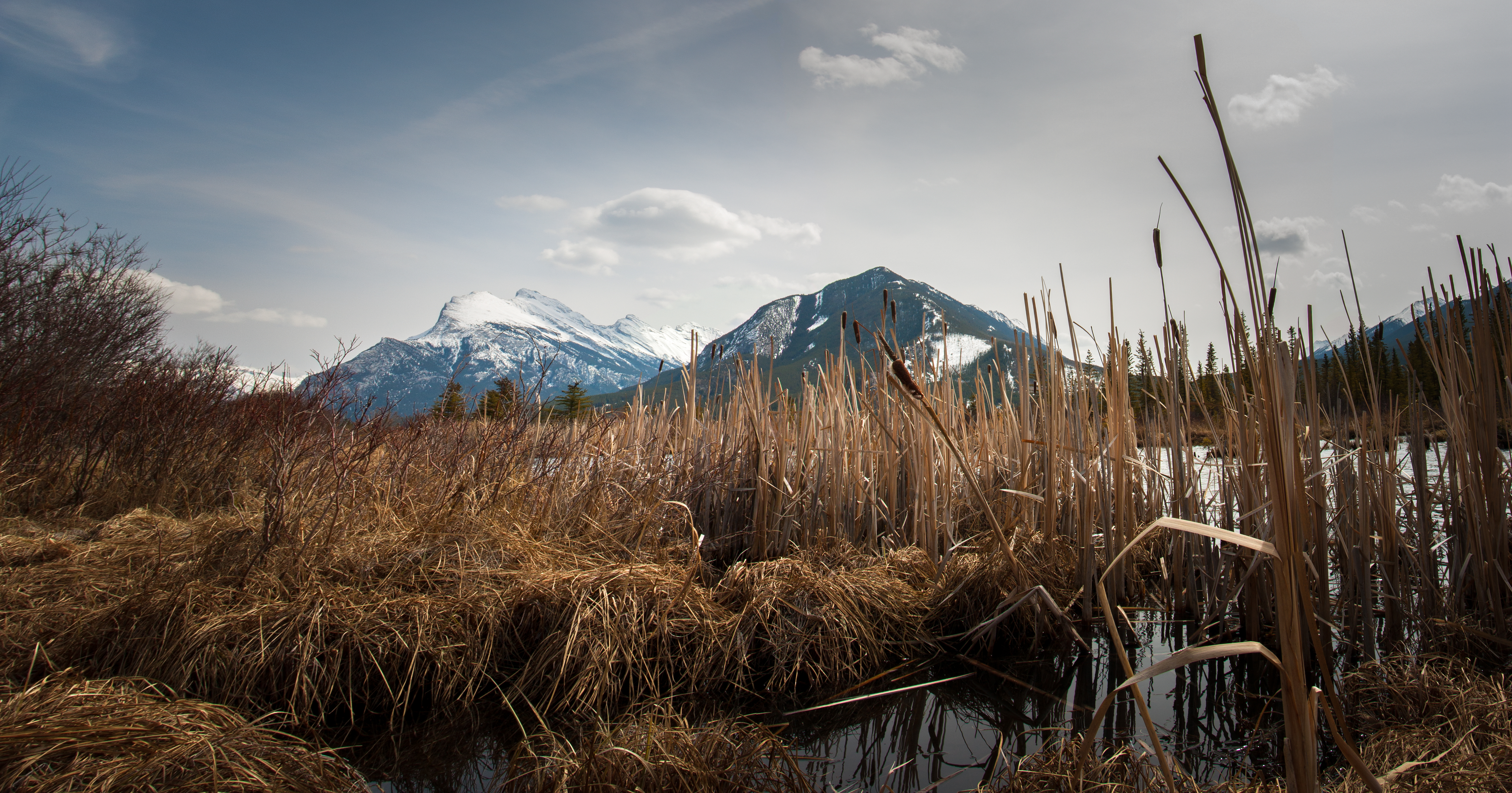
Mount Rundle and Sulphur Mountain as seen from the reeds along the shore of one of the Vermilion Lakes in Banff National Park, Alberta, Canada.

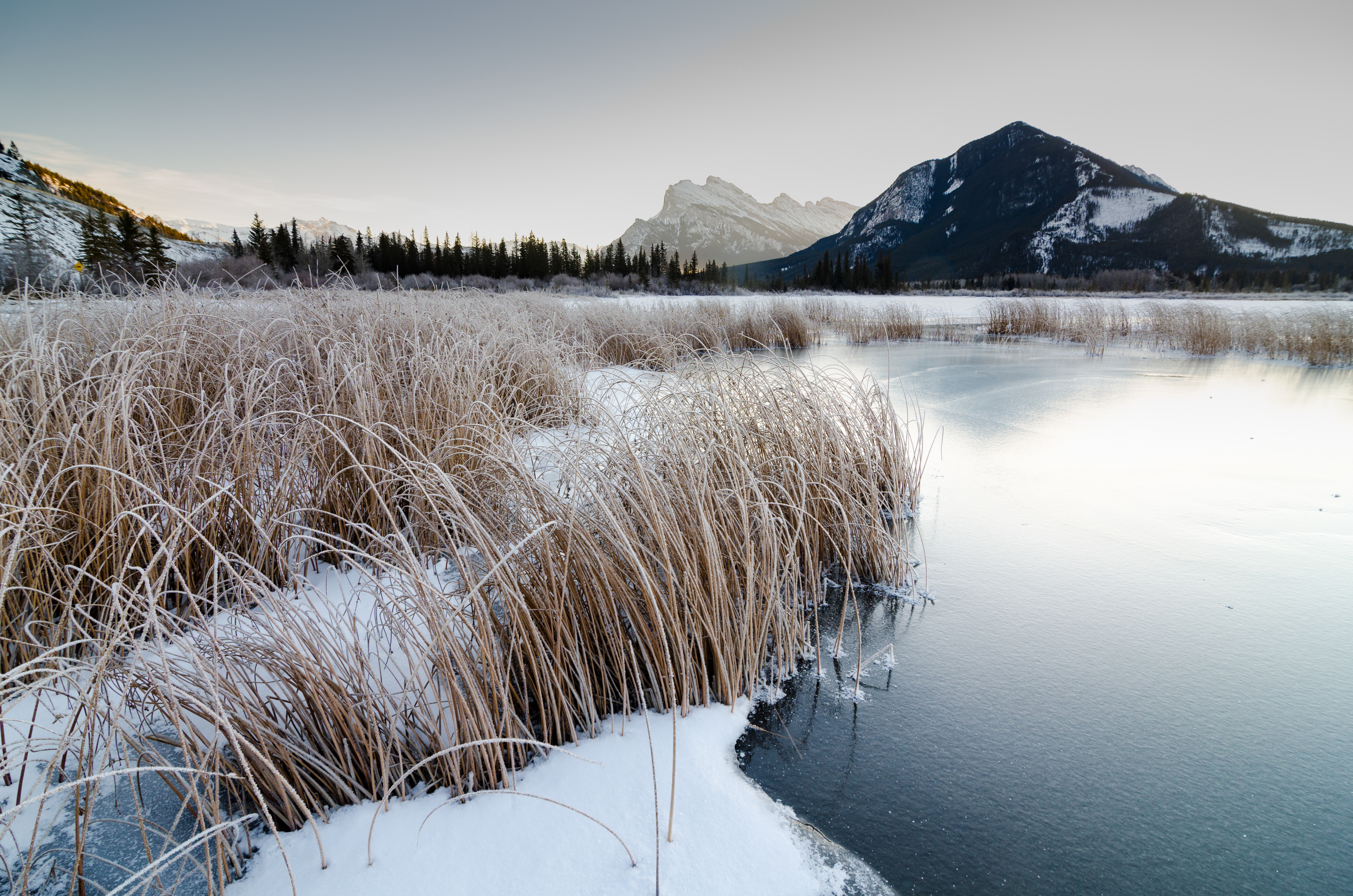
Winter Vermilion Lakes

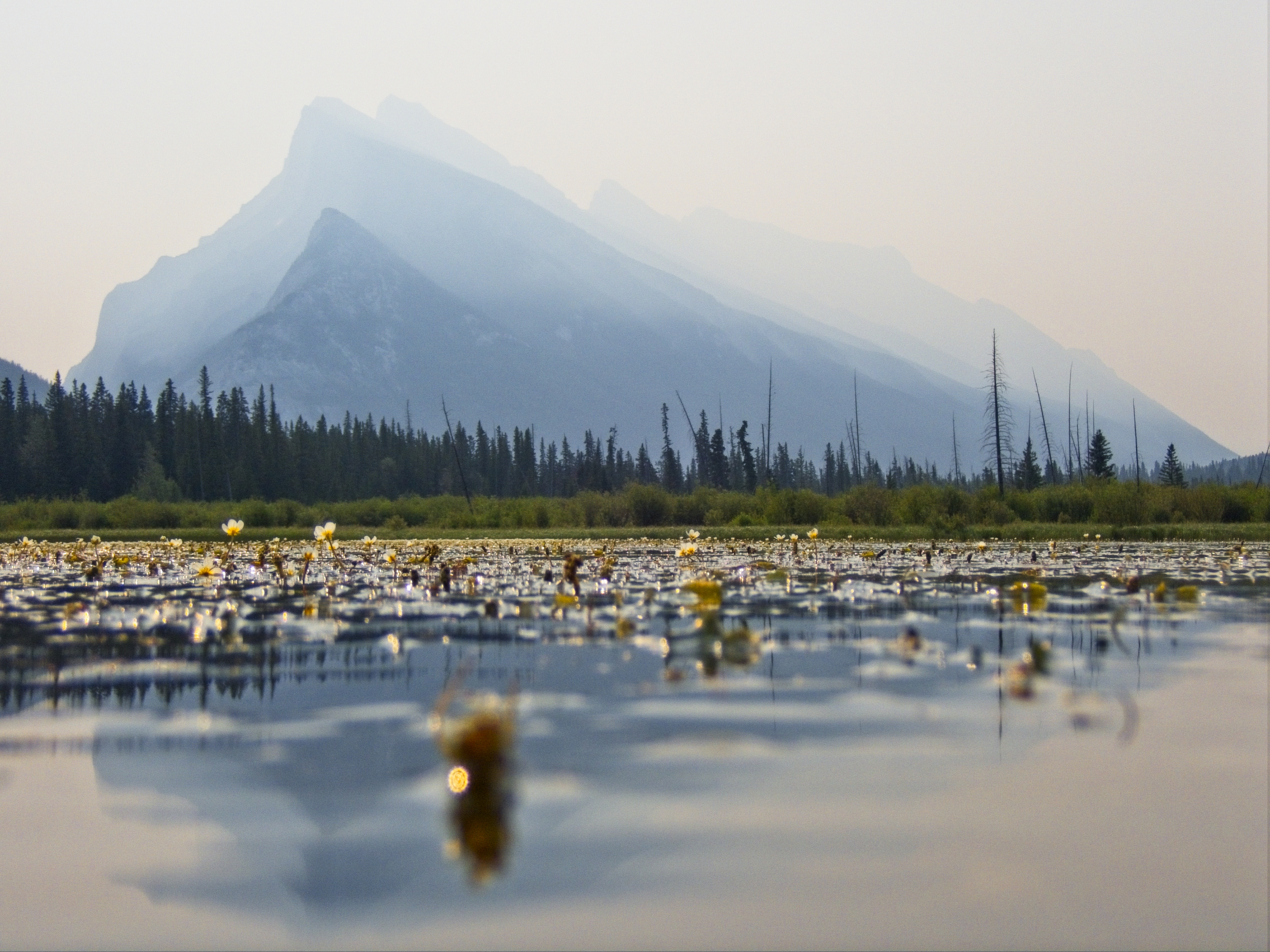
Mount Rundle through the haze of wildfire smoke, as seen from the middle of Vermilion Lake one
