= East End of Rundle =

Mountain in Alberta, Canada

East End of Rundle (EEOR)
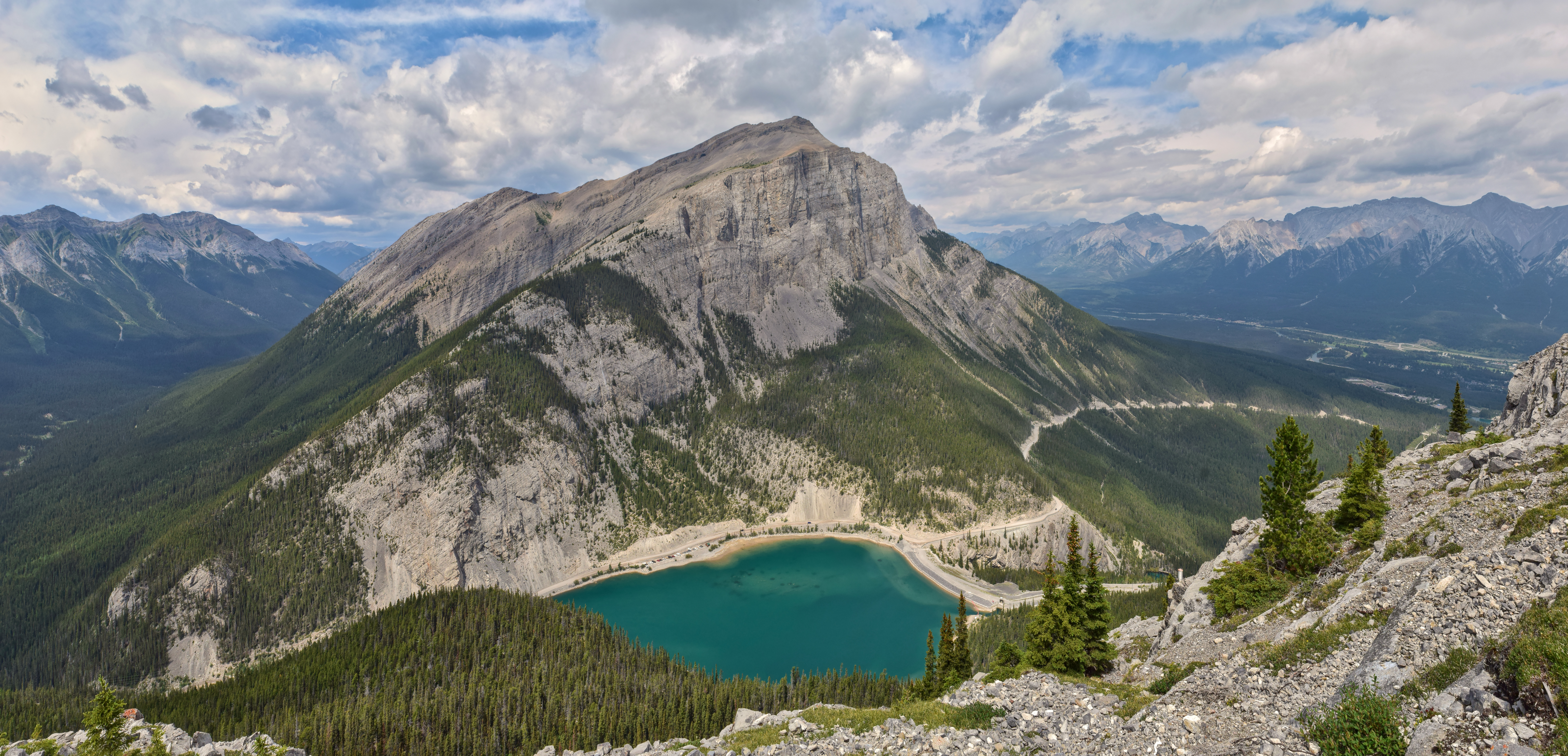
- East End of Rundle and Whitemans Pond seen from the Ha Ling Trail

Highest point
- Elevation: 2,590 m (8,500 ft)
- Coordinates: 51°04′50″N 115°25′16″W

Geography
- Location within Alberta Location within Canada
- Interactive map of East End of Rundle
- Country: Canada
- Province: Alberta
- Parent range: South Banff Ranges, Canadian Rockies
- Topo map: NTS 82O3 Canmore

Climbing
- Easiest route: easy/moderate scramble

East End of Rundle (EEOR) is a mountain located immediately west of the town of Canmore, Alberta and immediately west of the Spray Lakes road in the Canadian Rockies. Mount Rundle occupies the space between Canmore and Banff on the southwest side of the Trans-Canada Highway.

There is a scrambling route up from the Spray Lakes road.

== Geology ==
The mountain is composed of sedimentary rock laid down during the Precambrian to Jurassic periods. Formed in shallow seas, this sedimentary rock was pushed east and over the top of younger rock during the Laramide orogeny.

== Climate ==
Based on the Köppen climate classification, the mountain is located in a subarctic climate with cold, snowy winters, and mild summers. Temperatures can drop below −20 °C with wind chill factors below −30 °C. Precipitation runoff from Rundle drains into the Bow River which is a tributary of the Saskatchewan River.

== Gallery ==
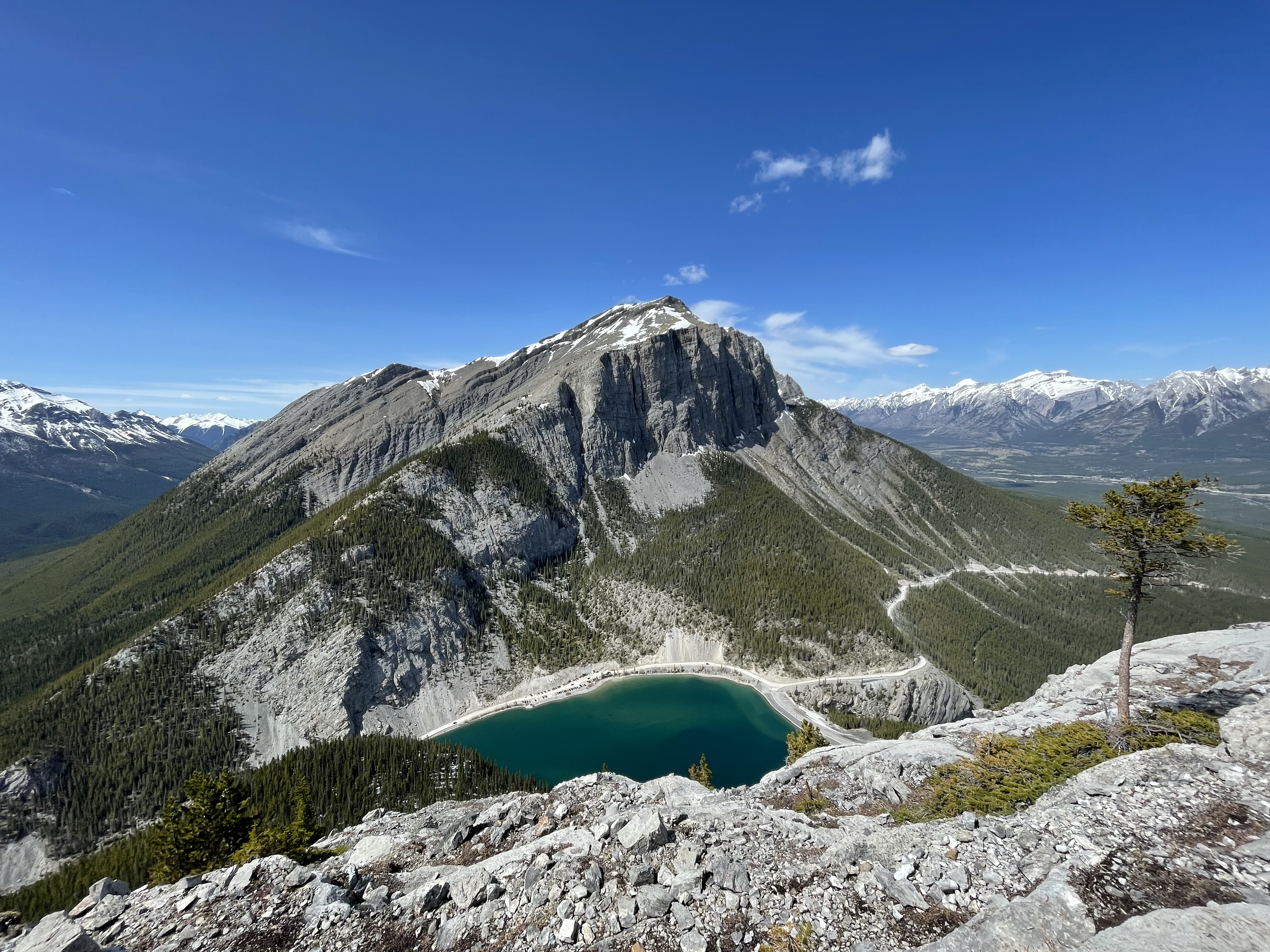
Southeast aspect

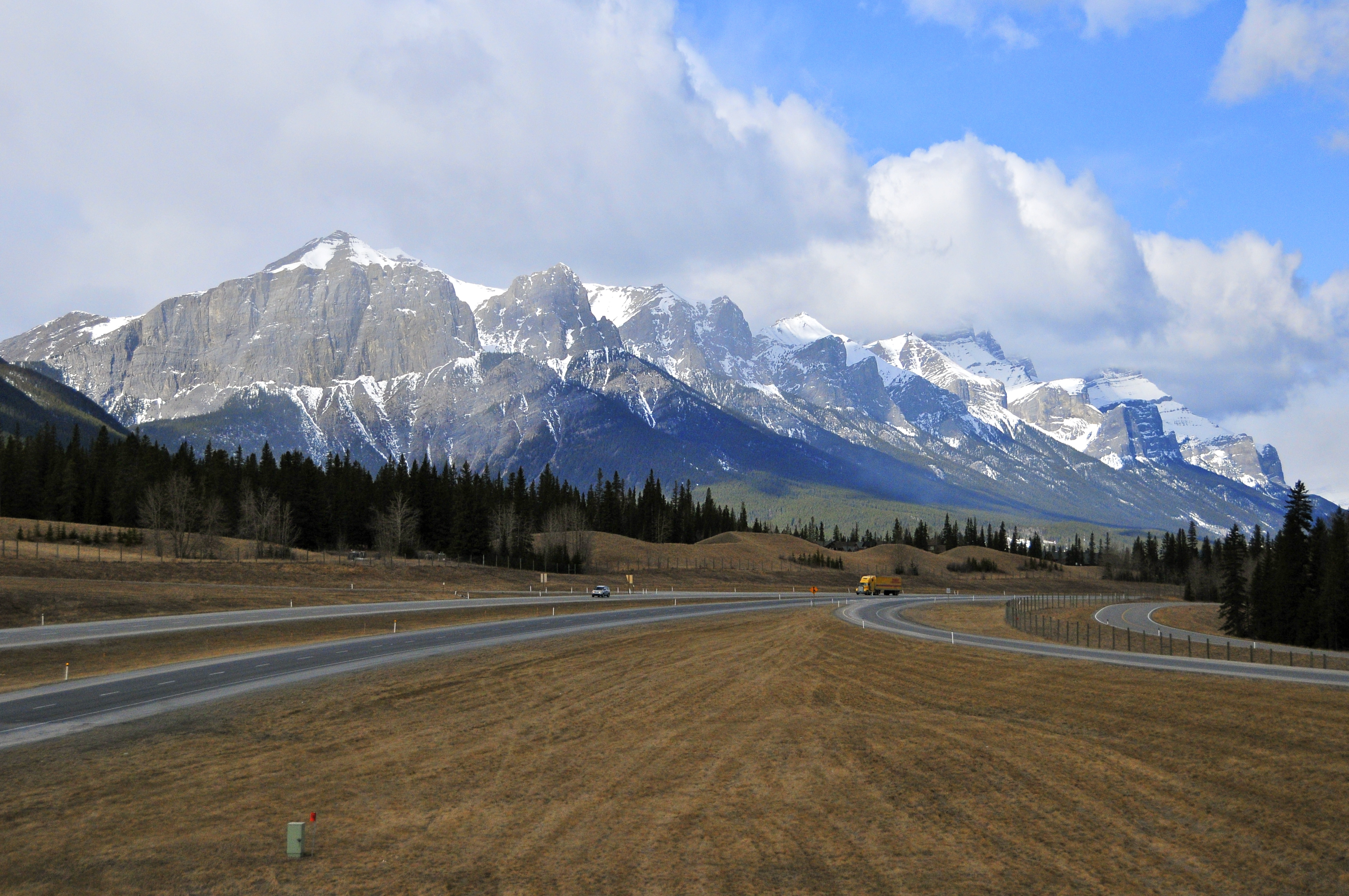
Mount Rundle with the East End to left

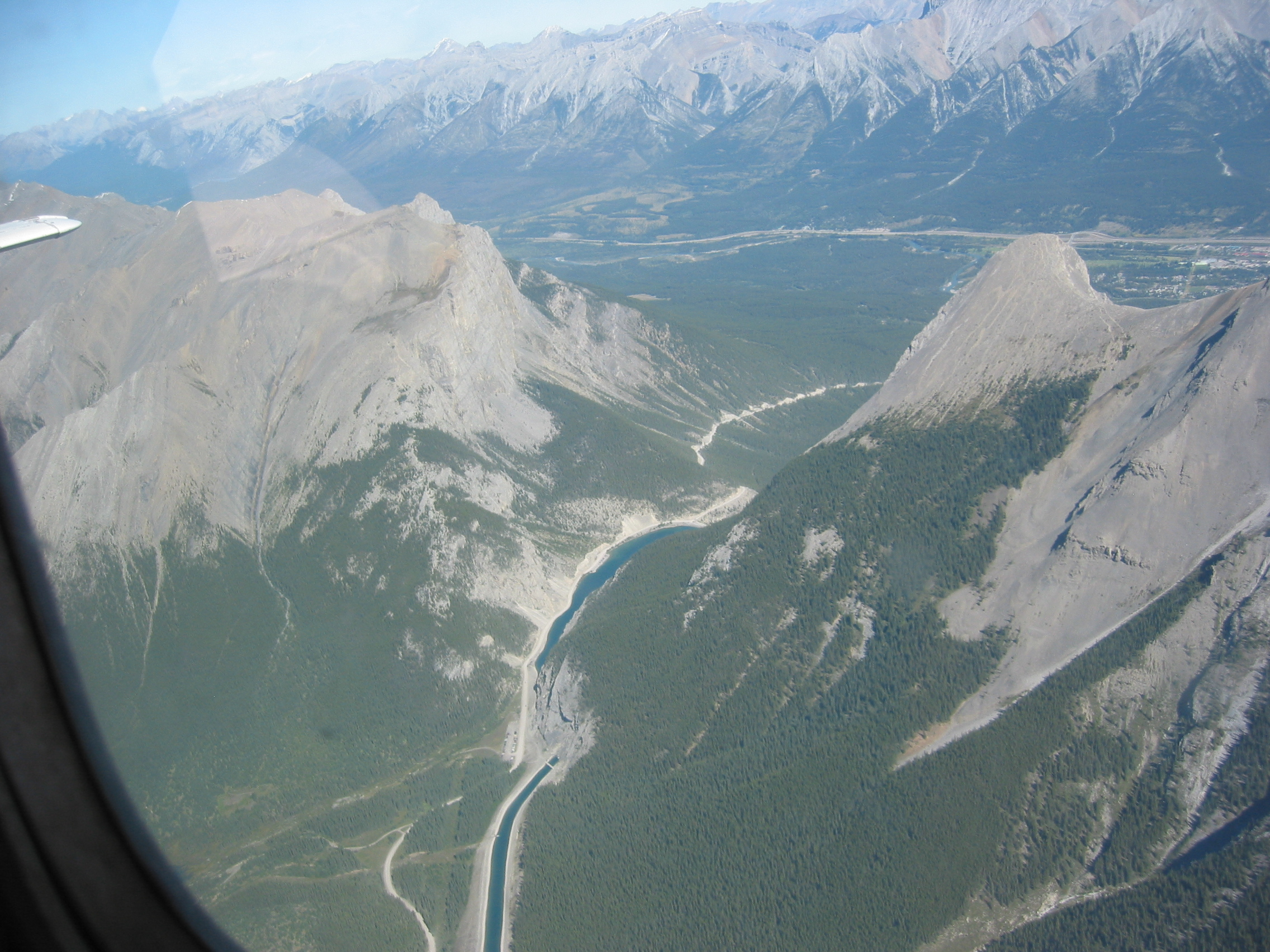
EEOR (left) and Ha-Ling (right) viewed from the South with Canmore in the background (Sept. 2006)

== See also ==
- List of mountains of Canada
- Geography of Alberta
