= Tunnel Mountain =

Mountain in Alberta, Canada

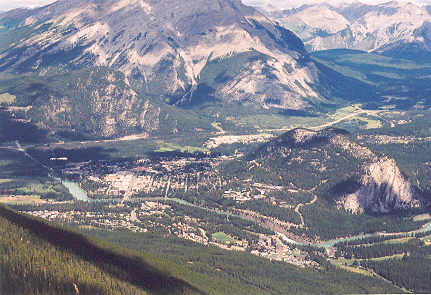
- Tunnel Mountain and Banff townsite, seen from Sulphur Mountain

Highest point
- Elevation: 1,692 m (5,551 ft)
- Prominence: 305 m (1,001 ft)
- Listing: Mountains of Alberta
- Coordinates: 51°10′35″N 115°33′17″W

Naming
- Native name: Iinii Istako (Blackfoot); Eyarhey Tatanga Woweyahgey Wakân (Stoney)

Geography
- Location within Alberta
- Country: Canada
- Province: Alberta
- Protected area: Banff National Park
- Parent range: South Banff Ranges, Canadian Rockies
- Topo map: NTS 82O4 Banff

Climbing
- Easiest route: Hiking trail

Tunnel Mountain, also known as Sleeping Buffalo (Siksiká: Iinii Istako; Nakoda: Eyarhey Tatanga Woweyahgey Wakân), is a mountain located in the Bow River Valley of Banff National Park in Alberta, Canada at the junction of the Spray River with the Bow and overlooking the Hot Springs on Sulphur Mountain. The mountain is nearly completely encircled by the town of Banff and the Banff Springs Hotel grounds. For many Indigenous people, the Buffalo is not sleeping anymore since Banff National Park reintroduced wild bison in 2017.

== Etymology ==
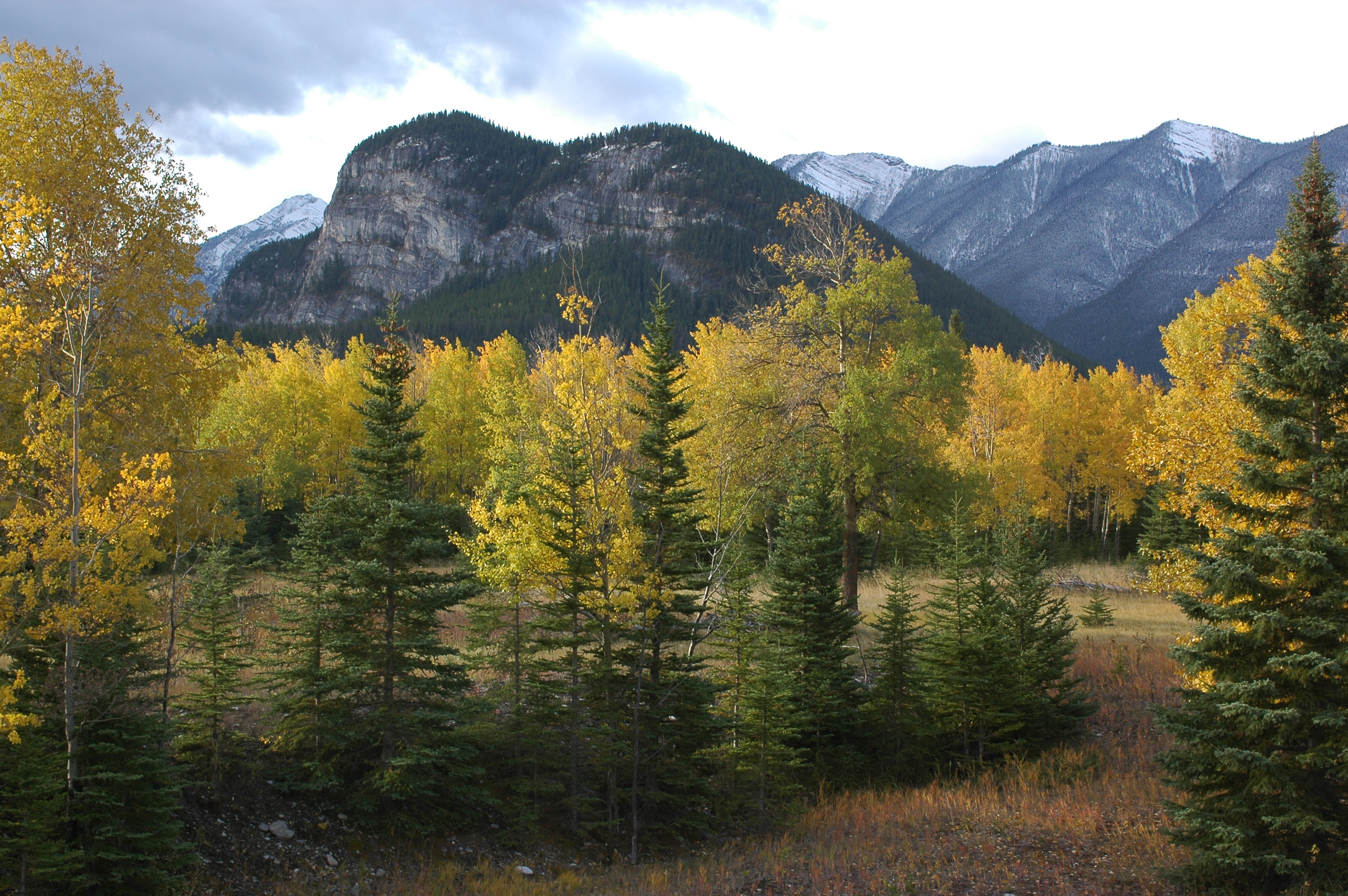
Tunnel Mountain from the north resembles a sleeping buffalo.

The Blackfoot name for the mountain is Iinii Istako and the Stoney Nakoda language name is Eyarhey Tatanga Woweyahgey Wakân. The Stoney people called it "Sleeping Buffalo" for a long time, as it resembles a sleeping buffalo when viewed from the north and east. In 1858, James Hector named the small peak "The Hill", likely in reference to its status as the smallest peak adjacent to the Banff townsite. In the 1880s Canadian Pacific Railway surveyors first considered blasting a tunnel through the mountain for the tracks through the Bow Valley. Even though they discovered another route for the train and the tunnel idea was abandoned, the name Tunnel Mountain stuck. In September 2016, fifteen First Nations signed a resolution calling for the beginning of an official process with the Natural Resources Canada's Geographical Names Board of Canada to rename Tunnel Mountain, Sacred Buffalo Guardian Mountain. At their November 2017 "Indigenous Leaders' Dialogue" in Banff, representatives granted the name, Sacred Buffalo Guardian Mountain ceremonially as they await the decision of the NRC.

The fire lookout on top of the mountain began to be known as "King's Lookout," following a Royal Tour in 1939 when King George VI and Queen Elizabeth climbed to the lookout.

== History ==
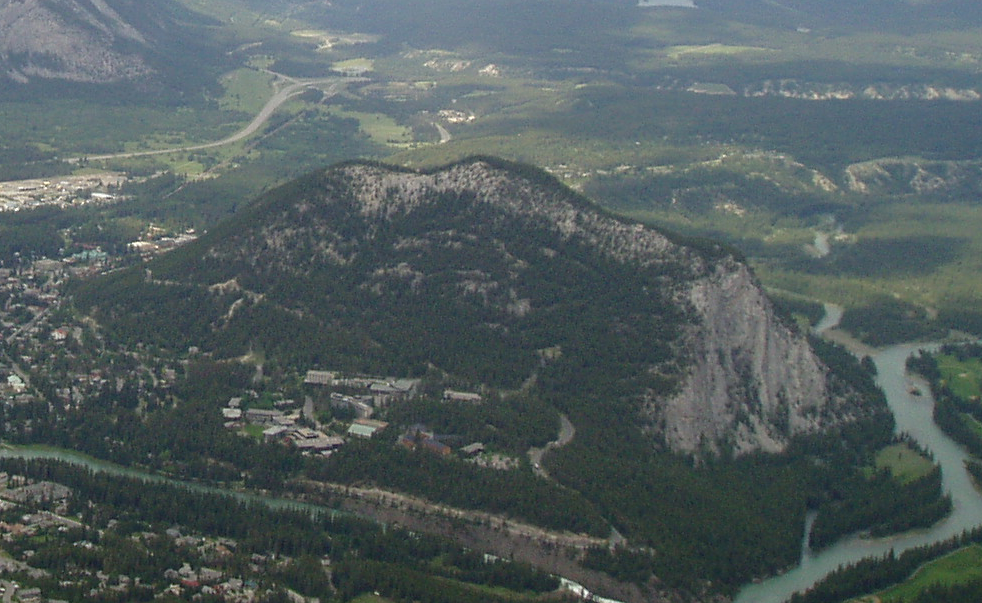
Tunnel Mountain seen from Sulphur Mountain, with Bow River in foreground and the CP railway and Trans-Canada Highway in the background

In 1882, a team of surveyors led by Major A.B. Rogers, of Rogers Pass fame, was surveying for the construction of the Canadian Pacific Railway. Rogers, likely in a hurry, assumed the easiest path for the railway to take would be to simply follow the Bow River. On account of the difficulties that would be faced with river crossings and the steepness of the cliffs between the northwestern edge of Mount Rundle and Tunnel Mountain, Rogers' team suggested the construction of a 275 m (902 ft) tunnel through the tiny mountain. CPR General Manager William Cornelius Van Horne was furious at the suggestion, exclaiming "Are we going to hold up this railway for a year and a half while they build their damned tunnel? Take it out!" An alternative route north of the mountain was found, which incidentally shortened the railway by a mile, and avoided two long hills, saving the CPR millions of dollars. Surveyor Charles Shaw described the suggestion of a tunnel as "the most extraordinary blunder I have ever known in the way of engineering." The idea of a tunnel was scrapped altogether, but the mountain is still called Tunnel Mountain to this day.

== Hiking ==
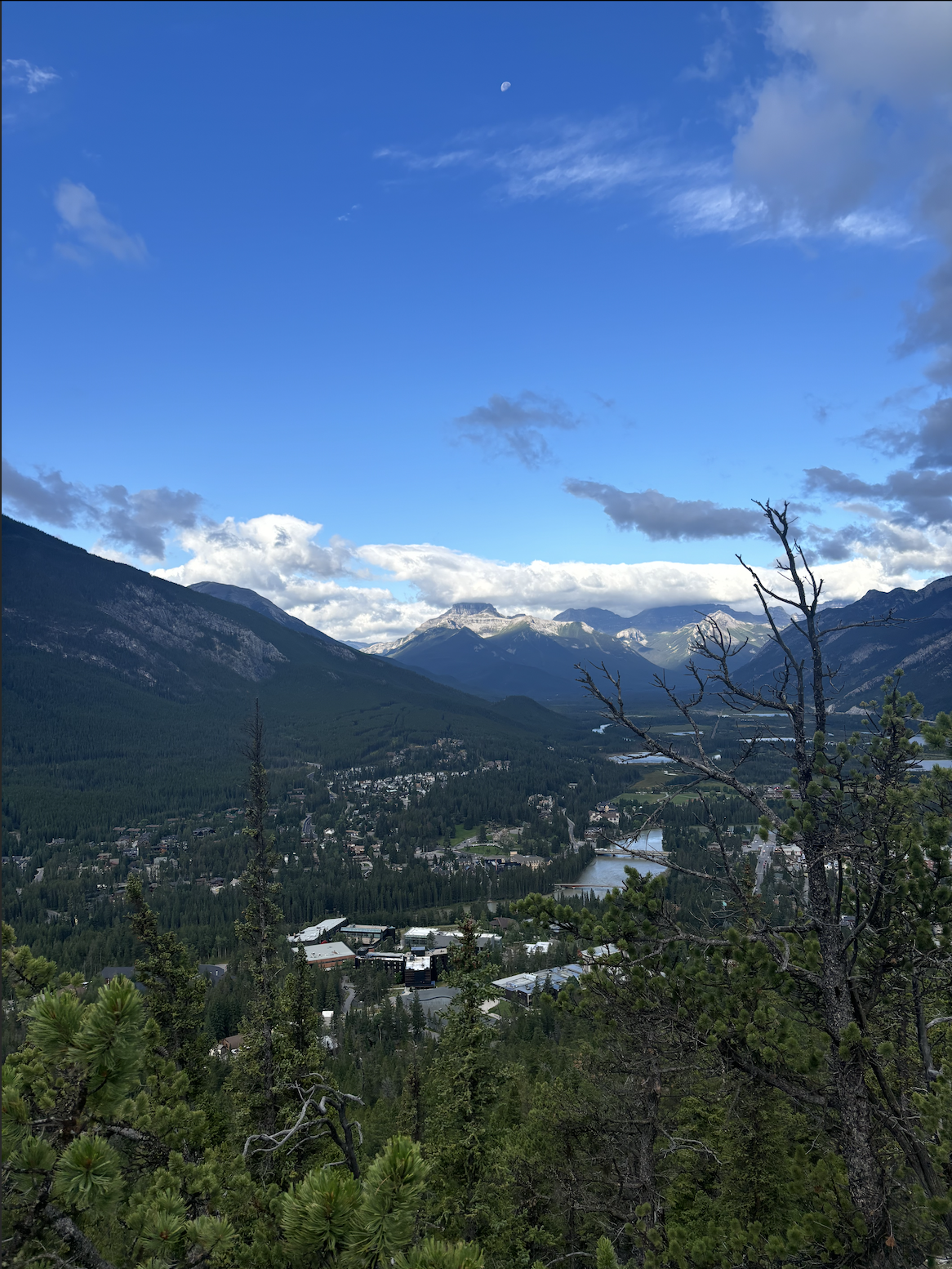
View of Banff from Tunnel Mountain in August 2024

Tunnel Mountain, likely due to its easy grade and location in the heart of Banff, is a very popular hike. The trail has a gentle grade for most of the way, with a few mildly steep sections, and is only 4.3 km (3 mi) round-trip. The top offers a panoramic view of the townsite, the Bow valley and the surrounding wilderness, and many recommend it as an easy introductory hike to the area.

The mountain has also drawn praise from many famous mountaineers. James Outram, the first person to climb Mount Assiniboine climbed Tunnel in 1900, commenting "the view will never be forgotten." Arthur O. Wheeler, co-founder of the Alpine Club of Canada also praised the view:

Although only 5500 feet in altitude above sea level, the summit is a magnificent viewpoint, covering the Bow River valley both east and west. The chief advantage is that, set at a position ... midway between the valley bottom and the crests of the encircling mountain ranges, it does full value in perspective to the depths and to the heights.

Perhaps the most devout admirer of the mountain was Anne Ness, a local resident. Anne climbed Tunnel Mountain over 8000 times over a 40-year period, averaging 200 ascents a year. Ness was even known to climb the mountain twice a day; once during lulls in her job, and a second in the evening. Famed wildlife artist Carl Rungius had his ashes scattered on the mountain, as he loved the view of Banff and the Bow Valley.

== Geology ==
Tunnel Mountain gives its name to the Tunnel Mountain Formation, a geological formation.

== See also ==
- Geography of Alberta
- Royal eponyms in Canada—locales in Canada named for royalty similar to King's Lookout on Tunnel Mountain
