= Belloy, Alberta =

Belloy
- Unincorporated community
- Location of Belloy in Alberta
- Coordinates: 55.7539°N 118.2333°W
- Country: Canada
- Province: Alberta
- Census division: No. 19
- Municipal district: Birch Hills County

Government
  - Type: Unincorporated
  - Governing body: Birch Hills County council
- Elevation: 570 m (1,870 ft)
- Time zone: UTC−06:00 (Alberta Time)

Belloy is a ghost town in Alberta, Canada within Birch Hills County. It is located north of Alberta Highway 49, 10 km (6.2 mi) east of Wanham and 15 km (9.3 mi) north of Peoria.

== Toponymy ==
Belloy was named after Octavie Belloy (known as Tavie Belge to North American audiences), a Belgian opera singer. The name was likely chosen by Belgian railway engineer Maurice Polet.

== Topography ==
Belloy lies in the Peace River Country region of northern Alberta, in the Birch Hills south of Peace River. With a landscape characterized by gently rolling hills, soil in the area is luvisolic and well-drained. The settlement lends its name to the Belloy Formation, a stratigraphical unit of the Western Canadian Sedimentary Basin.

== History ==
=== Founding and development: 1915–1949 ===
The site eventually known as Belloy was settled around 1915 by homesteaders, who named their community Grizzly Bear Prairie (or simply Grizzly Bear). The name derived from an early settler's claim to have seen a grizzly bear in the area. A cemetery was also established around this time.

In 1916, the Edmonton, Dunvegan and British Columbia Railway established a train station beside the community named Belloy. Nonetheless, a post office trading under the 'Grizzly Bear' name opened nearby in December 1916; it would only change its identifier to Belloy in May 1926. A modest farming community developed that hosted the post office and general store as its primary commercial operations.

The federal government established the Soldier Settlement Board in 1917, near the end of the First World War, to provide land to returning veterans. Land in Belloy was opened up as part of the scheme, and the locality's population expanded rapidly in a span of a few years. In 1922, a school opened one mile west of the Belloy road, named Steele School.

During the drought of the Dust Bowl in the 1930s, Belloy's favourable agricultural conditions brought another influx of farmers from other parts of Alberta. A school directly within the community, Belloy School, opened in 1936.

The end of the Second World War also brought new families to Belloy, after the Government of Alberta launched the Lassiter Project in 1945. Like the earlier work of the Soldier Settlement Board, this scheme made land available to returning veterans. Although its farms experienced a particularly dry summer in 1945, Belloy nonetheless expanded to reach its height around this time, receiving businesses including a pool hall, watchmaker, and a car dealership.

Residents of Belloy and surrounding areas formed a baseball league in 1947, comprising teams of locals from communities including Eaglesham and Rycroft. In 1949, Belloy's schoolhouse was sold and replaced with the Steele School building, which residents moved into their townsite.

=== Founding and development: 1950–2000 ===
Oil was discovered near Belloy in 1951. Production activity at the site would prove to be modest.

In 1952, Catholic practitioners purchased a church from Sexsmith and moved it to Belloy. (The church was originally built in Clairmont in 1916 before being transported to Sexsmith in 1920.) After enrolling just 45 students in 1954, Belloy School (formerly the Steele School) closed due to falling enrolment two years later, and a bus service began transporting students to Wanham. An outbreak of rabies among dogs and cattle in Belloy and Wanham in early 1955 necessitated the introduction of a dog leash law that spring. The 1950s also saw residents of Belloy open a community hall, constructed entirely by volunteers.

In 1960, the Belloy Community Association purchased the disused Belloy School, allowing local spiritual groups to use it for religious services. After Belloy's general store burned down in 1963, its owners chose to move elsewhere instead of rebuilding. The loss of this business, coupled with improvements to Alberta's highways, marked the start of Belloy's gradual depopulation, as residents began to move to larger centres with a broader array of services.

The Presbyterian Church purchased Belloy School in 1965, though dwindling attendance numbers would see the building close again in 1971. Belloy's post office closed in July 1969 after no permanent postmaster could be found, and its grain elevator closed in the 1970s, sometime after 1974.

According to a local history, Belloy's buildings, including its church and community hall, were "deserted" by 1982.

=== 21st century: 2001 to present ===
Belloy's Catholic church building was returned to Sexsmith in 2004, where it burned down in 2009 after a fire originating in Sexsmith's lumber yard spread.

As of 2013, Belloy still contains its historic Legion Hut, community hall, and railway station, though none remain in use.

== Demographics ==
Belloy recorded a population of 15 in the 1981 Canadian census.

== Places of interest ==
Belloy's historic cemetery, established around 1915, is abandoned, though it remains accessible to the public.

== See also ==
- List of communities in Alberta
- List of ghost towns in Alberta
