= Mount Rundle =

Mountain in Banff National Park, Canada

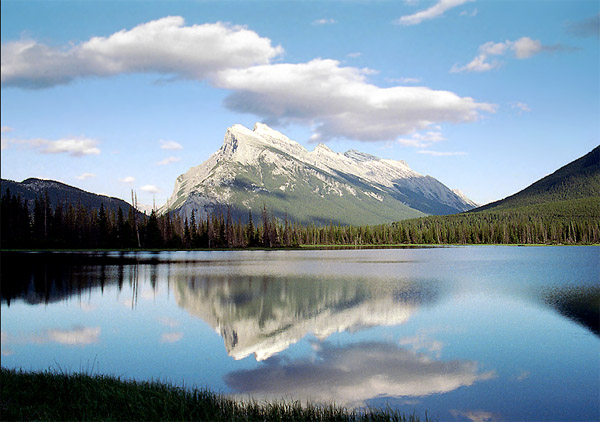
- Mount Rundle as seen from Vermilion Lakes

Highest point
- Elevation: 2,948 m (9,672 ft)
- Prominence: 1,304 m (4,278 ft)
- Coordinates: 51°08′52″N 115°29′40″W

Naming
- Native name: Waskahigan Watchi (Cree)

Geography
- Location within Alberta
- Interactive map of Mount Rundle
- Country: Canada
- Province: Alberta
- Parent range: Canadian Rockies (South Banff Ranges/Rundle Peaks)
- Topo map: NTS 82O3 Canmore

Climbing
- First ascent: 1888 by J.J. McArthur
- Easiest route: Scramble

Mount Rundle is a mountain in Canada's Banff National Park overlooking the towns of Banff and Canmore, Alberta. The Cree name was Waskahigan Watchi or house mountain. In 1858 John Palliser renamed the mountain after Reverend Robert Rundle, a Methodist invited by the Hudson's Bay Company to do missionary work in western Canada in the 1840s. He introduced syllabics there (Note: James Evans the supervisor of the Wesleyan missionaries in Rupert's Land who is credited with devising the Cree syllabics)—a written language developed for the Cree, as part of his missionary work. He only visited the Stoney-Nakoda of the area around what is now called Mount Rundle in 1844 and 1847.

Mt. Rundle could actually be considered a small mountain range as the mountain extends for over 12 kilometres (7.5 mi), on the south side of the Trans-Canada Highway eastward from Banff to Canmore with seven distinct peaks along the way. The third peak southeast of Banff is the highest at 9,675 feet (2,949 m). West of the Spray Lakes road is the East End of Rundle— locally known as EEOR (Note: pronounced Eeyore, like the character in Milne's Winnie-the-Pooh series)—which rises above Whiteman's Gap just south of Canmore. The Rundle Peaks are part of the South Banff Ranges, along with its siblings—the Sundance Range, Sulphur Mountain and the Goat Range.

== Geology ==
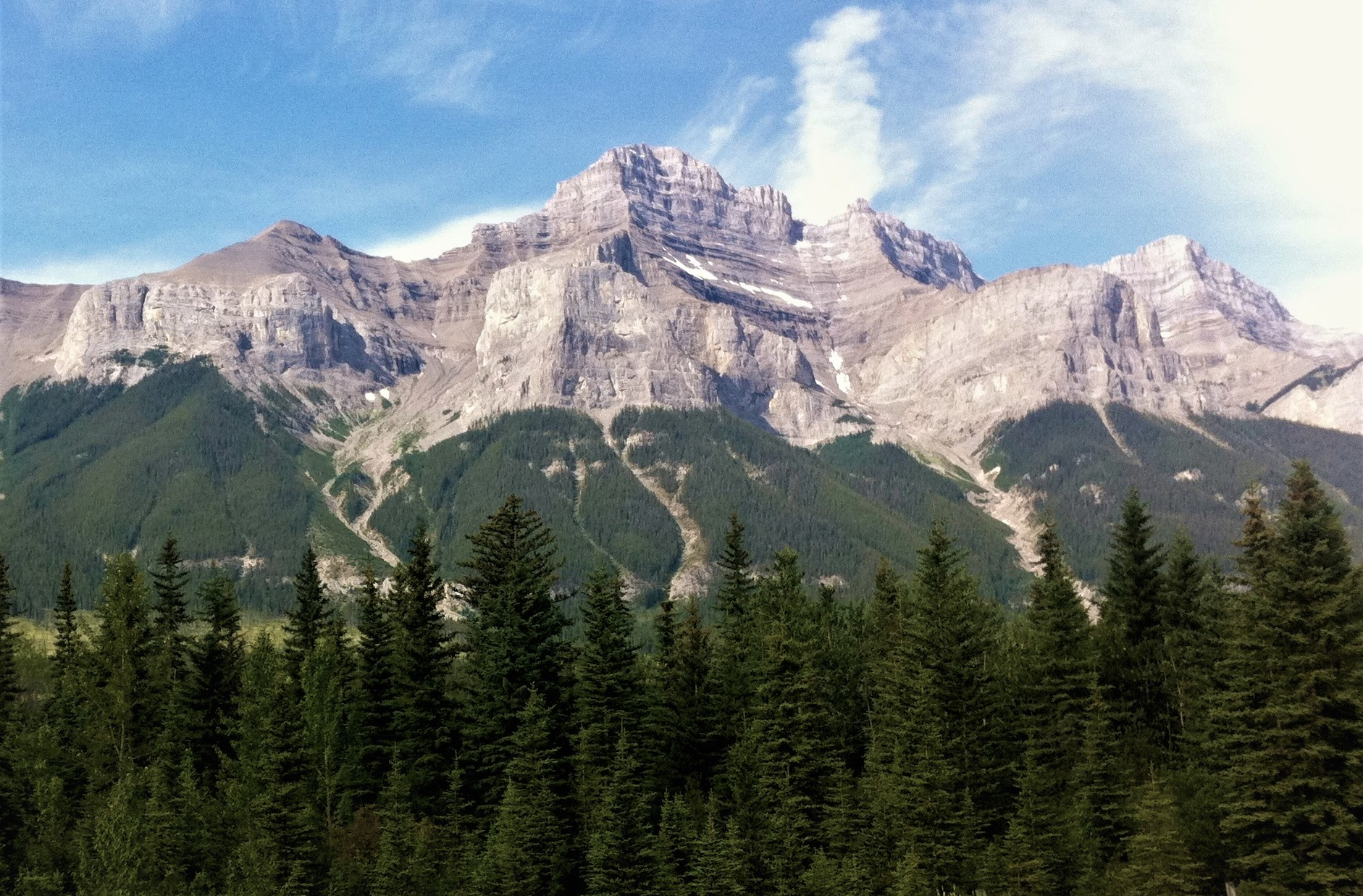
East aspect of Mount Rundle showing summit

Mount Rundle consists of limestones, dolomitic limestones, dolomites and shales of Paleozoic (Late Devonian to Mississippian) age. In ascending order, they belong to the Palliser, Exshaw and Banff Formations, topped by the Rundle Group, which was named after the mountain.

Mount Rundle illustrates the classic limestone-shale-limestone "sandwich" of the front ranges. The basal "slice of bread" is the lower massive cliffs of tough grey Pallister Formation limestones and dolomites. The "sandwich filling" is the Banff Formation, a layer of softer, more easily eroded, dark brownish-gray to black calcareous shale with thin beds of argillaceous limestone. The top layer of the geologic sandwich is the grey limestones and dolomites of the Rundle Group that form the massive upper cliffs at the top of Mount Rundle. Between the Palliser and the Banff lie the thin, recessive shales of the Exshaw Formation (the "lettuce leaf" of the sandwich), covered with debris from above.

The Paleozoic "sandwich" is part of the Rundle thrust sheet that was moved up from the west along the Rundle thrust fault and emplaced on top of the younger rocks (the Early Cretaceous Mist Mountain Formation) that underlie Canmore and the forested slopes along the Bow River. The thrust faulting occurred during the Columbian Orogeny between late Jurassic and early Cretaceous time. At that time a collision of tectonic plates caused huge sheets of sedimentary rock in what is now British Columbia to become detached and slide eastward to northeastward over their neighbors, piling up to form the southern Canadian Rockies. This left the Paleozoic strata on Mount Rundle dipping steeply to the southwest, so that the southwest-facing side of the mountain forms an extensive dip slope. Geologists consider Mount Rundle to be a classic example of a mountain cut in dipping layered rocks, with the tilted strata giving the mountain its shape.

The most recent stage in the history of Mount Rundle began in the Pleistocene epoch about two million years ago with the sculpting and gouging of the Canadian Rockies by glaciers, and then by streams and rivers. Finally, after the glaciers retreated for the last time, a series of steep, tree-covered alluvial fans began to grow at the mouths of the deep gulches on the northeast-facing side of the mountain.

=== Commerce ===
Rundle rock or Rundle stone, a natural stone, first quarried on Mount Rundle, is a common dimension stone used in southern Alberta for landscaping and building purposes. It has been used in the construction of the Banff Springs Hotel and several of the Parks Canada buildings. It is fine-grained sandstone dating back to the Triassic Period.

== Scrambles ==
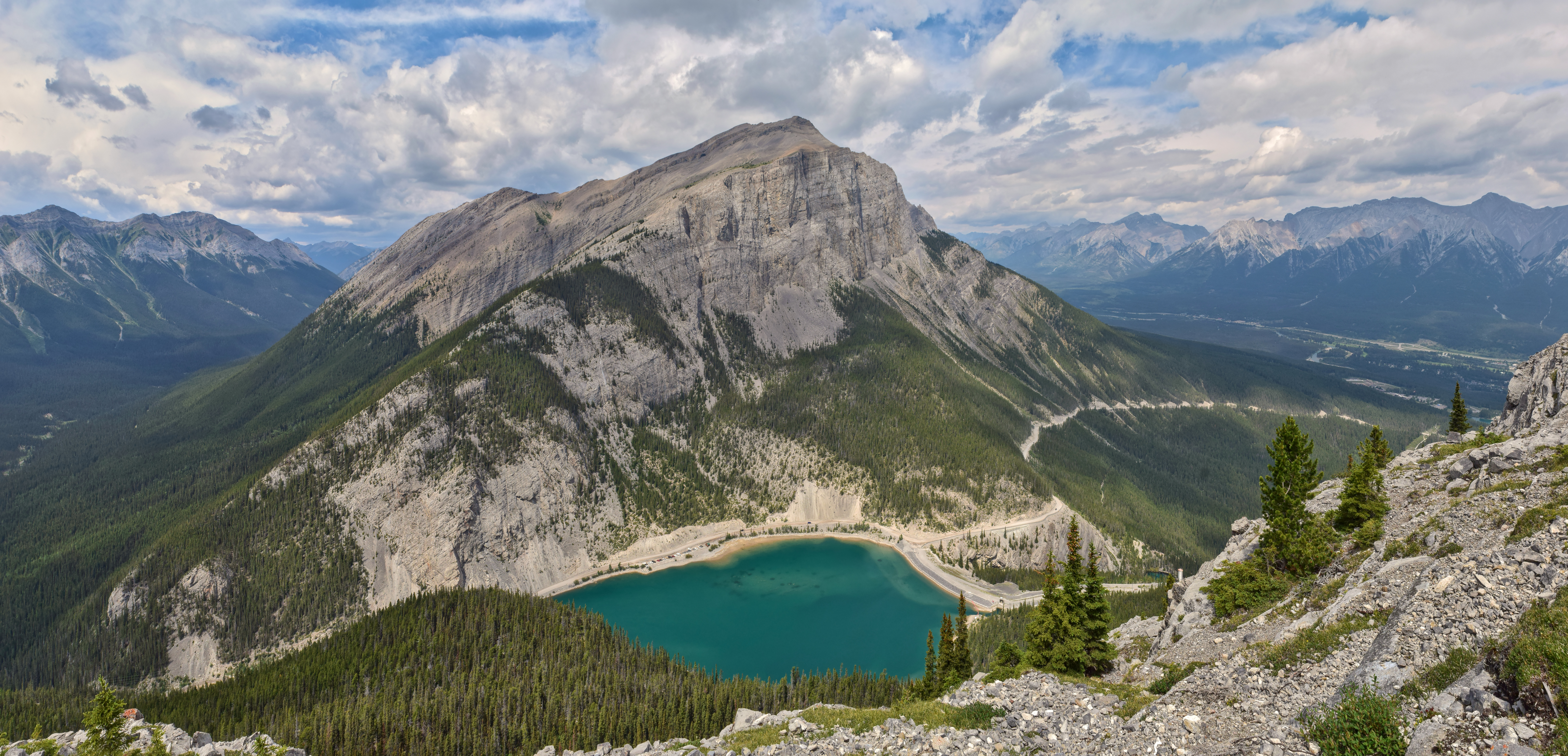
The East End of Rundle and Whitemans Pond from the Ha Ling Peak trail

At the East End of Rundle near Canmore there is a well-known scramble, the Goat Creek hiking trail, with its starting point at parking trailhead, which starts at the Smith-Dorrien/Spray Trail just south of the Canmore Reservoir above Grassi Lakes. This is also the beginning of the Mount Rundle Traverse, a demanding trek to mount all of Rundle's peaks from Goat Creek parking lot to the Banff Springs Hotel. Mount Rundle is one of the most popular scrambles in the area, and is relatively straightforward for experienced hikers.

In Banff, the Spray River trailhead for the first peak taking the Mount Rundle Trail, is near the Spray River bridge on the road to the Banff Springs Golf Course. The all-day hike (from 8–10 hours) from the trailhead to the peak is about 5 kilometres (3.1 mi) one-way and has an elevation gain of about 993 metres (3,258 ft) to the cliff bank on the first peak and 1,579 metres (5,180 ft) to the summit. Although it is called non-technical, it is considered gruelling by some. About halfway up there is a Central Gully, a huge watercourse with a well-worn path which is a dead end. Cliffs become higher and more vertical and there is no scrambling route. The real route crosses the watercourse and then immediately turns left (watch for markings). As one passes the treeline, the hiker ventures onto a feature called the "Dragon's back", where the route narrows between two steep gullies. The only real obstacle at this point is perseverance at the tread-mill like scree which slows progress to a two steps forward, one step back pattern.

The complete traverse from Banff to Canmore (staying always on the ridge) of the integral ridge was done "solo" in 1976 by the late Jean-Pierre Cadot. It required one bivouac, much scrambling, easy fifth-class rock climbing and one section was very involved and required lay-backing the ridge with a high degree of exposure. A long rappel was necessary to overcome a very steep section and it is most likely that the rappel station is still in place.

== Scenic viewpoints ==
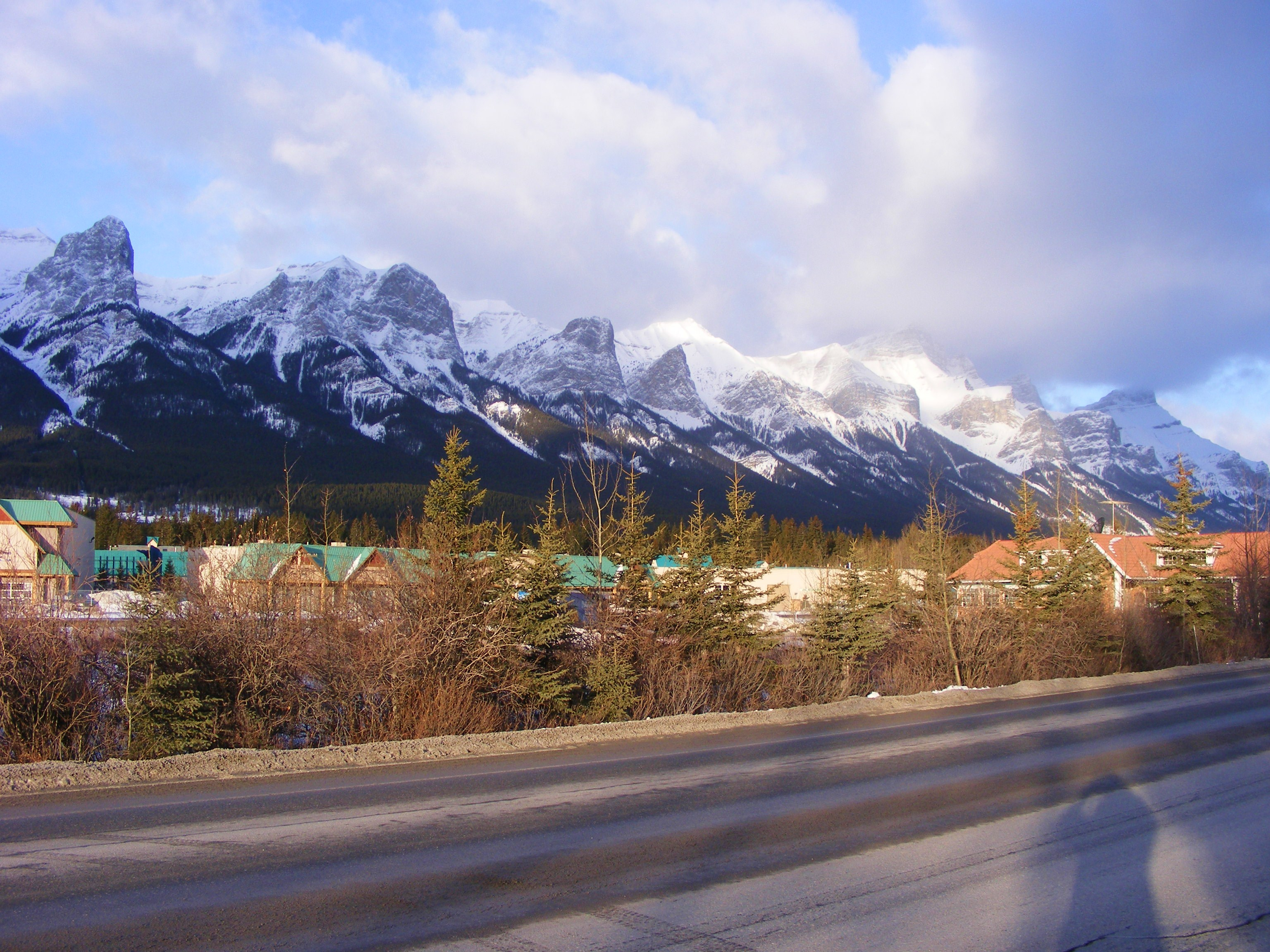
The northeast-facing side of the mountain, seen from Canmore. All the peaks seen here are part of Mount Rundle.

In 2000 Dave Birrell described Mount Rundle as one of the most recognized Canadian mountains. Painter, print-maker and art teacher, Walter Phillips RCA (Note: Walter Phillips played an important role in the development of their visual arts program at the Banff Centre for Arts and Creativity, then known as the Banff School of Fine Arts. Its Walter Phillips Gallery, which focuses on contemporary art, is named after him. The Glenbow Museum in Calgary, Alberta holds an extensive collection of Phillips works and a research archive.) (1884–1963) described Mount Rundle as his, "bread and butter mountain. I never tire of painting it, for it is never the same. In deep shadow in the morning, it borrows a warm glow from the setting sun at the end of the day. Its colour runs the gamut from orange to cold blue-grey, with overtones of violet and intervals of green."

=== From Vermilion Lakes ===
The viewpoint from which most photographs are taken, 5 kilometres (3.1 mi) from Mount Rundle, at the end of Vermilion Lakes road, with Vermillion Lakes in the foreground.

Scenic viewpoints

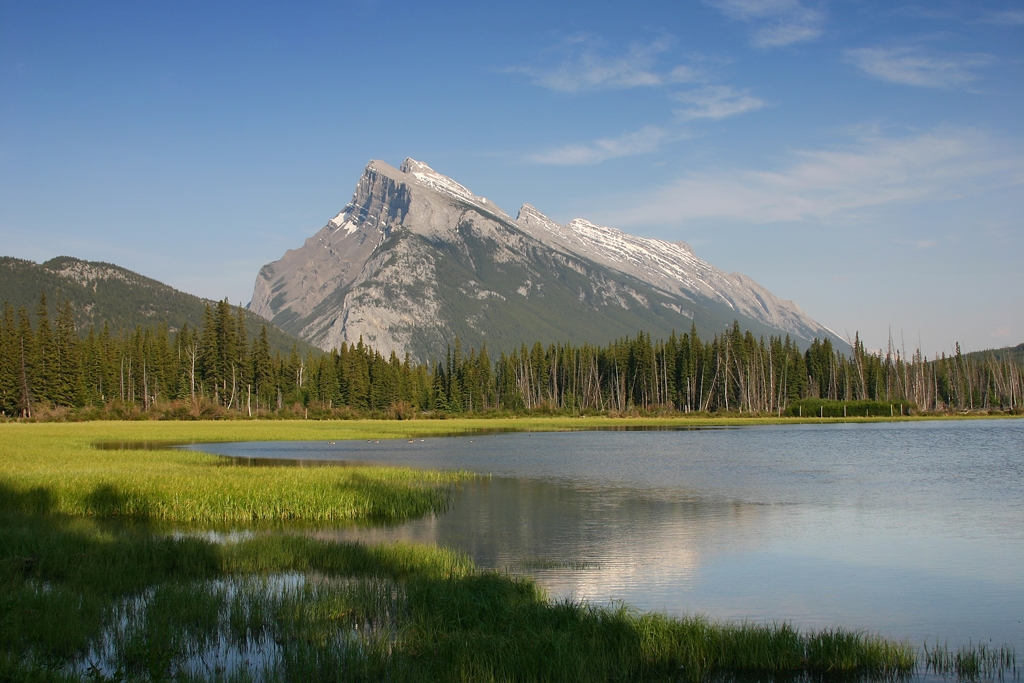
Mount Rundle seen from Vermilion Lakes

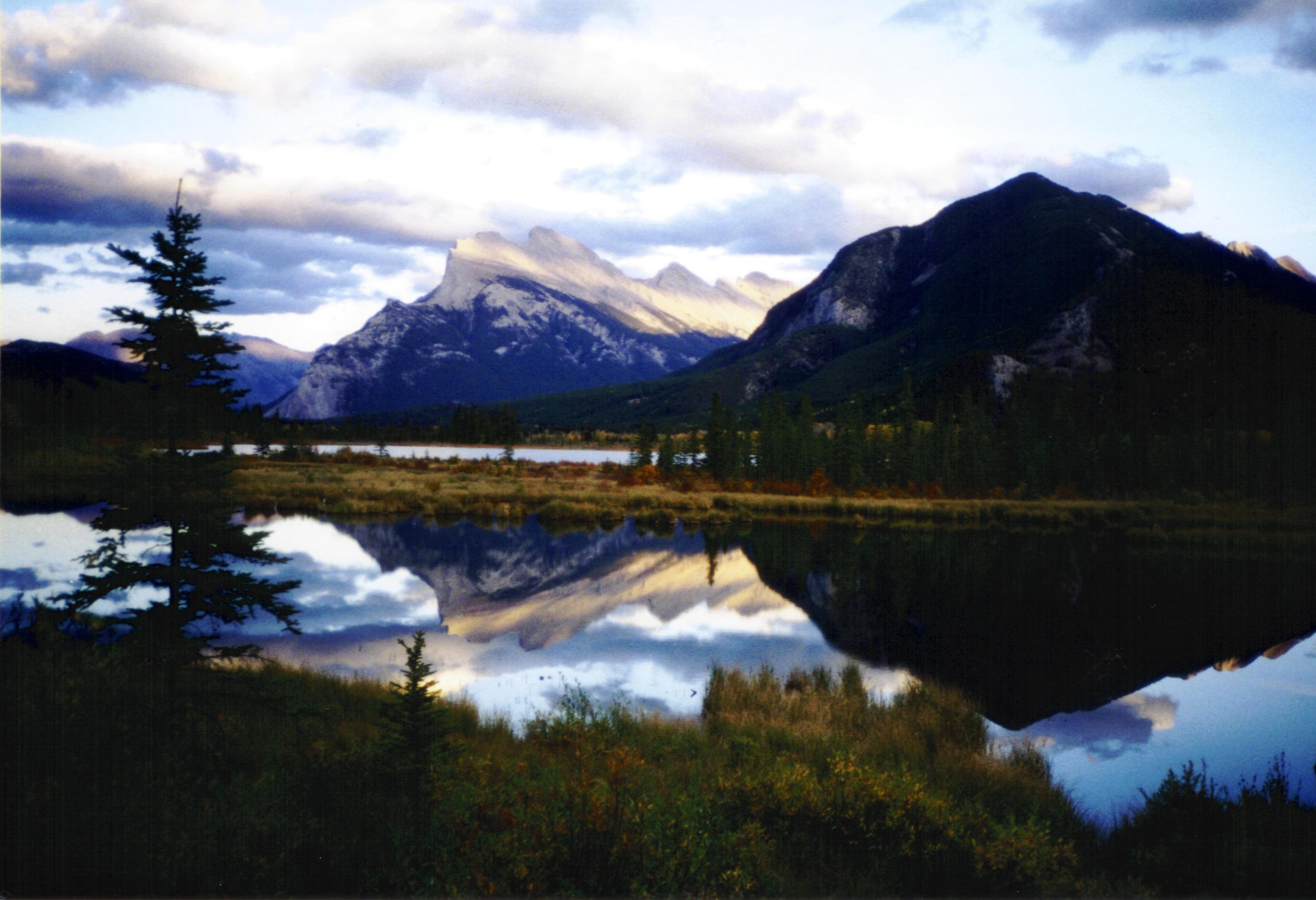
Mount Rundle reflected in the Vermilion Lakes

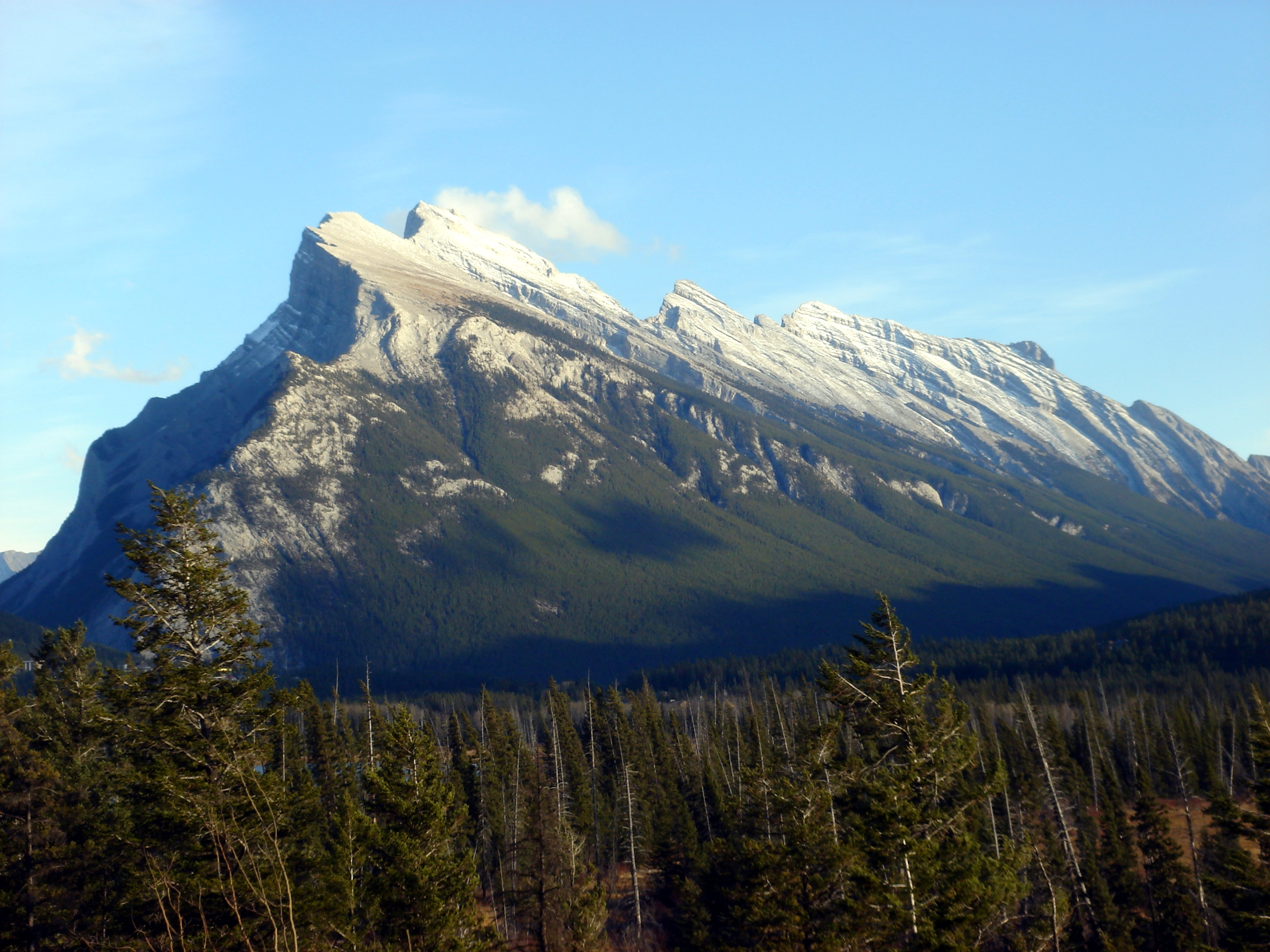
Mount Rundle seen from the Bow Valley

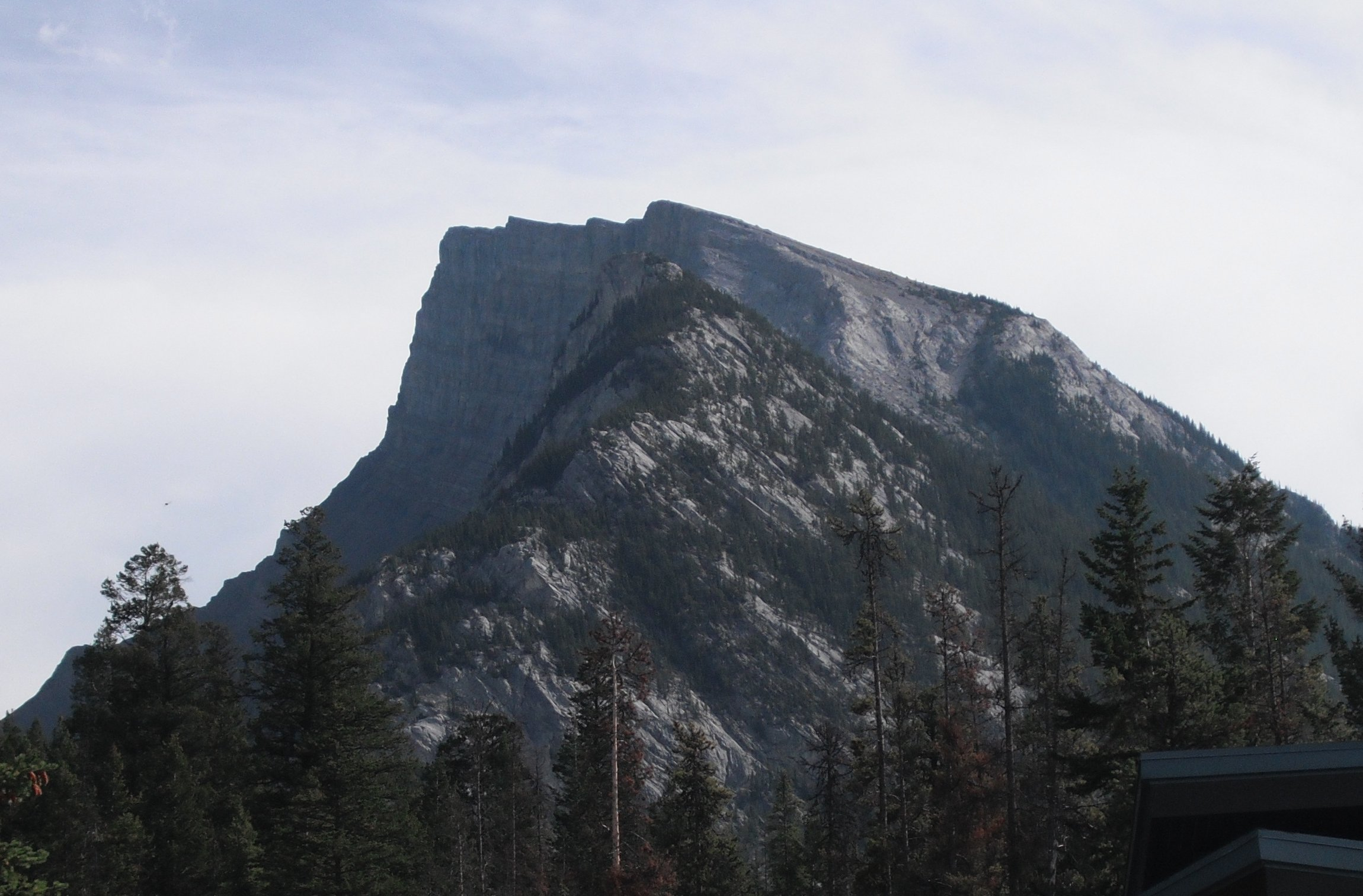
Mount Rundle, north face

Mount Rundle and Sulphur Mountain can be seen from Mount Norquay on the north side of the Trans-Canada Highway. The Banff Springs Hotel patio and restaurants look out over Mount Rundle and Tunnel Mountain.

== In popular culture ==
Mount Rundle is depicted on the cover of The Ghost Inside's album Get What You Give.
