= Debolt Formation =

Geologic formation in Canada

- Stratigraphic range: Meramecian
- Type: Geological formation
- Unit of: Rundle Group
- Sub-units: Upper Debolt; Lower Debolt
- Underlies: Golata Formation
- Overlies: Shunda Formation
- Thickness: up to 366 metres (1,200 ft)

Lithology
- Primary: Limestone, dolomite
- Other: Shale, anhydrite

Location
- Coordinates: 55.3057°N 117.8961°W
- Region: Alberta, British Columbia
- Country: Canada

Type section
- Named for: Debolt, Alberta
- Named by: G. Macauley, 1958

The Debolt Formation is a stratigraphic unit of Meramecian age in the Western Canadian Sedimentary Basin.

It takes the name from the hamlet of Debolt, Alberta, and was first described in the Amerada Crown GF23-11 well near Debolt by G. Macauley in 1958.

== Lithology ==
The Debolt Formation is commonly subdivided into a lower and upper unit. Lower Debolt rocks are bioclastic limestones deposited on a stable carbonate ramp. These lower Debolt rocks are rarely dolomitized and therefore have little porosity or commercial use. Upper Debolt sedimentation is characterized by a number of shallowing upwards facies. At the base of the Upper Debolt is distal and medial ramp argillaceous limestone facies with limited laminations and thin bedding. These argillaceous facies rarely contain clean carbonate interbeds in the medial ramp setting, predominantly wackestones and packstones. These facies are followed by a capping proximal ramp/shoal facies with abundant skeletal packstones and grainstones.

== Distribution ==
The Debolt Formation is present in the sub-surface in the Peace River Country in northern Alberta and north-eastern British Columbia. The formation is 366 metres (1,200 ft) thick close to the Rocky Mountains, and thins out northward and eastward. It has a thickness of 244 metres (800 ft) at its type locality near Debolt, Alberta.

== Relationship to other units ==
The Debolt Formation is the upper most component of the Rundle Group. It rests conformably on the Shunda Formation, resting on shale and carbonates. It is overlain conformably by the Golata Formation of the Stoddart Group in the west, and the upper contact becomes unconformable with gradually newer formations to the east and north (Permian, Triassic, Jurassic and Cretaceous beds).
