= Kananaskis Formation =

Geological formation

- Stratigraphic range: Late Pennsylvanian
- Type: Formation
- Unit of: Spray Lakes Group
- Underlies: Ishbel Group
- Overlies: Tunnel Mountain Formation
- Thickness: up to about 55 metres (180 ft)

Lithology
- Primary: Limestone, dolomite
- Other: Chert, quartzite

Location
- Coordinates: 50°48′24.1″N 115°15′47.9″W
- Region: Alberta
- Country: Canada

Type section
- Named for: Kananaskis Range
- Named by: A. McGugan and J.E. Rapson, 1961

The Kananaskis Formation is a geologic formation that is present on the western edge of the Western Canada Sedimentary Basin in the southern Canadian Rockies of western Alberta. Named after the Kananaskis Range near Banff, it was deposited during the Late Pennsylvanian sub-period of the Carboniferous period. Some of its strata host fossils of marine invertebrates.

== Lithology ==
The Kananaskis Formation consists primarily of pale grey weathering, thick- and thin-bedded silty limestone and dolomite, with beds and nodules of chert, chert breccias and conglomerates, and quartzites.

== Paleontology ==
Fusulinids, spiriferid brachiopods, gastropods, and sponge spicules have been described from some of the beds in the Kananaskis Formation.

== Thickness, distribution, and relationship to other units ==
The Kananaskis Formation has a maximum thickness of about 55 metres (180 feet) at its type section on the west flank of Mount Chester in the Kananaskis Range. It is present in the southern Canadian Rockies of western Alberta from the Kananaskis area south to the Canada–United States border. It conformably to unconformably overlies the Tunnel Mountain Formation and is unconformably overlain by the Ishbel Group.

== See also ==
- List of fossiliferous stratigraphic units in Alberta
