= Belloy Formation =

Stratigraphical unit of Permian age in Canada

- Stratigraphic range: Permian
- Type: Geological formation
- Underlies: Montney Formation, Fort St. John Group
- Overlies: Rundle Group, Stoddart Group
- Thickness: up to 274 metres (900 ft)

Lithology
- Primary: Chert
- Other: Sandstone, siltstone, conglomerate, dolomite

Location
- Coordinates: 55.7604°N 118.0487°W
- Region: Alberta, British Columbia
- Country: Canada

Type section
- Named for: Belloy, Alberta
- Named by: H.L. Halbertsma, 1959

The Belloy Formation is a stratigraphic unit of Permian age in the Western Canadian Sedimentary Basin.

It takes the name from the hamlet of Belloy, Alberta, and was first described in the Imperial Belloy 12-14-78-1W6M well by H.L. Halbertsma in 1959.

== Lithology and depositional setting ==
The Belloy Formation is composed of mixed carbonate-siliciclastic sequences of cherty dolomite and sandstone, glauconitic and quartz sandstones, phosphorite, siltstones and conglomerate with phosphatic chert pebbles. The Belloy was deposited along a northwest-trending, tidally-influenced, west-prograding shoreline.

== Distribution ==
The Belloy Formation reaches a maximum thickness of 274 metres (900 ft) in the Canadian Rockies foothills south of Fort St. John. It thins out towards the east and occurs in the sub-surface throughout the Peace River Country.

== Relationship to other units ==
The Belloy Formation is disconformably overlain by Triassic or younger beds (Montney Formation, Fort St. John Group). It is unconformably overlies Mississippian sediments such as those of the Rundle Group.

The Belloy Formation is homotaxial with the Belcourt Formation and Kindle Formation of the Rocky Mountains.
