= Etherington Formation =

Geologic formation

Coordinates: 50.4°N 114.6°W

- Stratigraphic range: Carboniferous
- Type: Formation

Location
- Region: Alberta
- Country: Canada

The Etherington Formation is a geologic formation in Alberta. It preserves fossils dating back to the Carboniferous period.

== See also ==
- List of fossiliferous stratigraphic units in Alberta
