= Rundle Group =

Geological formation in Canada

- Stratigraphic range: Middle to Late Mississippian
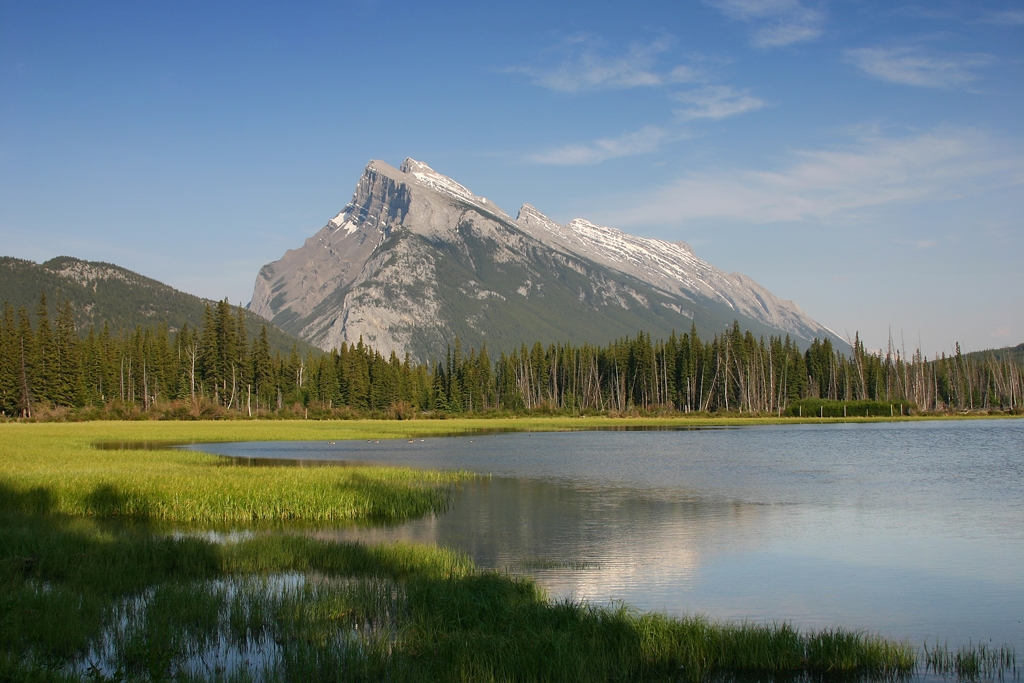
- The massive limestone beds form outcrops at the top of Mount Rundle.
- Type: Geological formation
- Sub-units: Debolt, Shunda, Pekisko, Mount Head, Livingstone, Turner Valley, Prophet
- Underlies: Fernie Formation, Belloy Formation
- Overlies: Banff Formation
- Thickness: up to 741 m (2,430 ft)

Lithology
- Primary: Limestone
- Other: Chert

Location
- Coordinates: 51.15°N 115.50°W
- Region: Alberta, British Columbia
- Country: Canada

Type section
- Named for: Mount Rundle
- Named by: R.J.W. Douglas, 1953

The Rundle Group is a stratigraphic unit of Mississippian age in the Western Canadian Sedimentary Basin.

It takes the name from Mount Rundle (itself taking the name from Robert Terrill Rundle), and was first described in outcrops at the northern side of the mountain in Banff National Park by R.J.W. Douglas in 1953.

== Lithology ==
The Rundle Group consists of massive limestone interbedded with dark argillaceous limestone. Chert nodules are observed in the shaley beds, and crinoids and brachiopods are observed in the clean massive beds. Dolomitization is observed in the Elkton Member of the Turner Valley Formation.

== Distribution ==
The Rundle Group reaches a maximum thickness of 741 feet (230 m) at Tunnel Mountain. It thins out toward east and north and is completely eroded or absent in east central and only the lower part occurs in southern Alberta.

== Relationship to other units ==
The Rundle Group is disconformably overlain by the Rocky Mountain Formation in the front ranges of the Canadian Rockies and by the Fernie Formation in the foothills and by Cretaceous beds in the prairies. It conformably overlies the Banff Formation.

The Rundle Group can be correlated with the Mission Canyon Formation in southern Saskatchewan, northeastern Montana and North Dakota.

=== Subdivisions ===
The Rundle Group includes the Mount Head Formation and Livingstone Formation in the Rocky Mountains; by the Turner Valley Formation, Shunda Formation and Pekisko Formation in the foothills and plains. It is equivalent to the Debolt Formation and Prophet Formation in north-eastern British Columbia and west-northern Alberta. Debolt, Shunda and Pekisko formations are staked in the Fort Nelson area.

==== Canadian Rockies ====
Sub-unit	Age	Lithology	Max. thickness	Reference
Mount Head Formation	Visean	Wileman Member - silty dolomite Baril Member - ooid grainstone, dolomite Salter Member - dolomite, boundstone and wackestone, ooid grainstone, anhydrite chert Loomis Member - massive grainstone Marston Member - microcrystalline dolomite, boundstone, breccia, ooid limestone, shale, marlstone Opal Member - grainstone, subordinate marlstone, chert packstone and wackestone, shale, marlstone, breccia Carnarvon Member - wackestone to packstone, shale interbeds	7.6 m (20 ft); 39 m (130 ft); 67 m (220 ft); 101 m (330 ft); 68 m (220 ft); 161 m (530 ft); 90 m (300 ft)	
Livingstone Formation	Tournaisian to Visean	crinoidal limestone, massive limestone, thin argillaceous limestone beds, dolomite	452 m (1,480 ft)	

==== Foothills and plains ====
Sub-unit	Age	Lithology	Max. thickness	Reference
Turner Valley Formation	Visean	crinoidal limestone and crystalline dolomite; two porous intervals are separated by a middle tight unit; diagenetically dolomitized in west southern Alberta; Lower porous zone is defined as Elkton Member	110 m (360 ft)	
Shunda Formation	Tournaisian to Visean	argillaceous limestone and dolomite, siltstone, sandstone, shale, breccia, anhydrite	122 m (400 ft)	
Pekisko Formation	Tournaisian	Upper Pekisko - lithographic limestone Lower Pekisko - massive crinoidal limestone	134 m (440 ft)	

==== Deep basin ====
Sub-unit	Age	Lithology	Max. thickness	Reference
Debolt Formation	Meramecian	Upper Debolt - crystalline dolomite, anhydrite, micritic limestone Lower Debolt - cherty bioclastic (crinoidal) limestone, argillaceous in the north	366 m (1,200 ft)	
Prophet Formation	middle Tournaisian to late Visean	chert, skeletal to ooid limestone, shale, marlstone, dolomite	760 m (2,490 ft)	
