= Ishbel Group =

Stratigraphic unit of Permian age in Canada

- Stratigraphic range: Permian
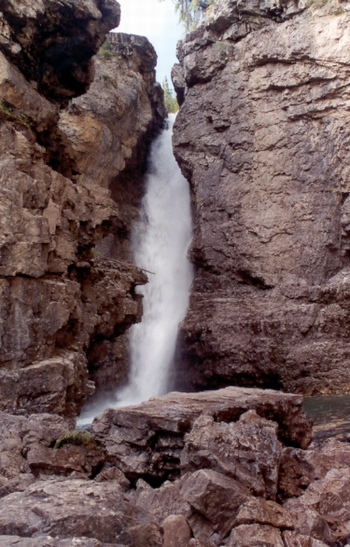
- Calcareous siltstone exposed along the Johnston Creek west of Banff
- Type: Group
- Underlies: Spray River Group
- Overlies: Tunnel Mountain Formation, Kananaskis Formation
- Thickness: Up to about 425 m (1,394 ft)

Lithology
- Primary: Limestone, dolomite, sandstone
- Other: Chert, siltstone

Location
- Region: Alberta, British Columbia
- Country: Canada
- Extent: Western Canadian Sedimentary Basin

Type section
- Named for: Mount Ishbel
- Named by: A. McGugan
- Year defined: 1963

The Ishbel Group is a stratigraphic unit of Permian age in the Western Canadian Sedimentary Basin. It is present in the Canadian Rockies of Alberta and British Columbia. First defined by A. McGugan in 1963, it is named for Mount Ishbel of the Sawback Range in Banff National Park, and parts of the group were first described in the vicinity of the mountain at Ranger Canyon and Johnston Canyon.

== Lithology ==
The Ishbel Group is composed of carbonate rocks (limestone and dolomite) and sandstone, with minor chert and siltstone. Depositional conditions were similar to those of the Phosphoria Formation to the south in United States.

== Paleontology ==
Among the fossils that have been found in the Ishbel Group are corals, bryozoa, crinoids, and conodonts, as well as productid, chonetid and spiriferid brachiopods, omphalotrochid gastropods, and edestid elasmobranch fish.

== Distribution ==
The Ishbel Group reaches a maximum thickness of up to about 425 metres (1400 ft). It is present in the front ranges of the Canadian Rockies as far north as the Peace River.

== Subdivisions ==
Sub-unit	Age	Lithology	Max. thickness	Reference
Kindle Formation	Asselian to early Artinskian	siltstone, shale	200 m (660 ft)	
Belloy Formation	Permian	limestone, dolomite, and sandstone	274 m (900 ft)	
Fantasque Formation	Permian	spicular chert, shale, and siltstone	55 m (180 ft)	
Mowitch Formation	Roadian to Wordian	sandstone with gypsum	76 m (250 ft)	
Ranger Canyon Formation	Roadian to Wordian	dark chert, silicified sandstone, evaporite minerals	30 m (100 ft)	
Ross Creek Formation	late Sakmarian to Artinskian	shaly siltstone, calcareous siltstone, silty carbonate, phosphatic coquinas	143 m (470 ft)	
Telford Formation	Asselian to Sakmarian	sandy limestone and dolomite	259 m (850 ft)	
Johnston Canyon Formation	late Sakmarian to Artinskian	phosphatic siltstone, calcareous siltstone, and silty limestone and dolomite	57 m (190 ft)	
Belcourt Formation	Asselian to Sakmarian	silty dolomite with chert	130 m (430 ft)	

== Relationship to other units ==
The Ishbel Group is disconformably overlain by the Spray River Group and unconformably overlies the Tunnel Mountain Formation and the Kananaskis Formation. It is partly equivalent to the Phosphoria Formation of Montana, Idaho, Wyoming, and Utah.
