= Hulcross Formation =

Geologic formation in British Columbia, Canada

- Stratigraphic range: Late Albian
- Type: Formation
- Unit of: Fort St. John Group
- Underlies: Boulder Creek Formation
- Overlies: Gates Formation
- Thickness: Up to 135 metres (440 ft)

Lithology
- Primary: Shale, mudstone
- Other: Siltstone

Location
- Region: British Columbia
- Country: Canada

Type section
- Named for: Mount Hulcross
- Named by: Wickenden and Shaw

The Hulcross Formation is a geologic formation in the Western Canada Sedimentary Basin in northeastern British Columbia that was deposited in marine environments during the late Albian stage of the Early Cretaceous period. At one time considered to be a member of the Commotion Formation, it was elevated to formation status by D.F. Stott in 1982. It preserves ammonites and other fossils.

== Lithology ==
The Hulcross Formation consists of dark grey to black shales and mudstones that were deposited in marine environments. The sediments coarsen upward and thin beds of siltstone and platy sandstone are present in the uppermost part. Sideritic ironstone concretions are common.

== Thickness and distribution ==
The Hulcross Formation is present in northeastern British Columbia throughout the foothills of the Canadian Rockies between the Peace and Kakwa Rivers, where it reaches thicknesses of up to 135 metres (440 ft). It is exposed along the Peace River eastward from the foothills almost as far as its confluence with the Halfway River.

== Relationship to other units ==
The Hulcross Formation is part of the Fort St. John Group. Originally described as a member of the Commotion Formation, the Hulcross was elevated to formational status along with the other members of the Commotion by D.F. Stott in 1982, who proposed that the term 'Commotion Formation' be abandoned.

The shales of the Hulcross abruptly overlie the sandstones of the Gates Formation and grade into the overlying sandstones of the Boulder Creek Formation. It is equivalent to the Harmon Member of the Peace River Formation in the Peace River plains to the east, and to the Wildhorn Member of the Scatter Formation in the Liard River region.

== See also ==
- List of fossiliferous stratigraphic units in British Columbia
- Various Contributors to the Paleobiology Database. "Fossilworks: Gateway to the Paleobiology Database". Archived from the original on 25 March 2022.
