= Clement Bowman =

Canadian chemical engineer (1930–2021)

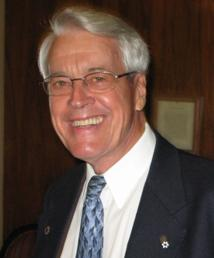
- Born: Clement Willis Bowman; January 7, 1930; Toronto, Ontario
- Died: October 7, 2021 (aged 91); Sarnia, Ontario
- Education: University of Toronto
- Occupation: Chemical Engineer
- Employer: Imperial Oil Limited
- Known for: Founding chairperson of Alberta Oil Sands Technology and Research Authority; Member of the Order of Canada; Laureate of the Global Energy International Prize; Inductee of the Canadian Petroleum Hall of Fame
- Parent(s): Clement Willis Bowman Sr. Emily Bowman
- Scientific career
- Fields: Chemical engineering
- Thesis: Mass transfer from disperse particles. (1960)
- Website: clembowman.info

Clement Willis Bowman CM FCAE PEng (January 7, 1930 – October 7, 2021) was a Canadian chemical engineer, the founding chairperson of the Alberta Oil Sands Technology and Research Authority. He was a Member of the Order of Canada and a recipient of the Global Energy Prize.

== Career ==
After graduating from the University of Toronto as a chemical engineer in 1952, Bowman worked for several years with DuPont Canada on the production of nylon in Kingston, Ontario. He then returned to the University of Toronto in 1957 for postgraduate work. In 1958, he attained a MASc and then a PhD in 1961.

After receiving his PhD, Bowman joined Imperial Oil Limited, an affiliate of Exxon Corporation, at the Esso Research Centre in Sarnia, Ontario. In 1964, he was assigned to a test of bitumen separation on the oil sands formation in Alberta. He worked for Syncrude Canada Limited for the next six years, conducting studies on the molecular and interfacial properties of the oil sands and the mechanism of the Clark hot water separation process, leading to a paper presented at the Seventh World Petroleum Congress in Mexico City in 1967.

In the late 1960s the government of Alberta decreased the rate of oil sands development, and Bowman returned to Imperial's research department in Sarnia, and was later promoted to senior researcher.

In 1975, Bowman was appointed the first chairperson of the Alberta Oil Sands Technology and Research Authority (AOSTRA). AOSTRA is a crown corporation with a fund of US$100 million (worth US$600 million today). He was responsible for starting a project to obtain access to the deep oil sands deposits by sinking a shaft and drilling horizontal wells by directional drilling, now the basis of the widely adopted method of steam assisted gravity drainage (SAGD).

In 1984, Bowman returned to Imperial Oil as Vice President—Research of its division Esso Petroleum Canada, with responsibility for the Sarnia Research Centre. In 1986, he returned to Alberta as President of the Alberta Research Council, an Alberta crown corporation. At the Council, he led the organization into joint research ventures with the private sector, with the oil sands and their environmental issues remaining a priority. He left the Alberta Research Council in 1991 to open his own consulting practice. In 1989, five years after leaving AOSTRA, he received the Karl Clark Distinguished Service Award for his contributions to AOSTRA, and the funds led to a $10,000 endowment to the University of Alberta for a scholarship in his name.

Bowman was a key adviser to Premier Lougheed on energy issues throughout the 1970s and 1980s.

In 1991, Bowman developed a decision-making methodology, called ProGrid, based on the work of Alex Lowey and Phil Hood in their book The Power of the 2×2 Matrix. AOSTRA used it for practical decisions such as selecting research projects, choosing corporate strategies, and making decisions on proposals, grant applications and awards in a number of Canadian research institutions and Centres of Excellence, such as Alberta Heritage Foundation for Medical Research, the Canadian Foundation for Innovation and the Ontario Centres of Excellence.

From 2005 to 2015, Bowman chaired the Energy Pathways Task Force for the Canadian Academy of Engineering, which published four reports and two books and held many workshops presenting energy options for Canada. He received the CAE Distinguished Service award in 2007 for his work on the task force.

== Recognitions and awards ==
During his career, Bowman held the office of President or Chairperson at the Canadian Society for Chemical Engineering, the Chemical Institute of Canada, and the Canadian Research Management Association. He received University of Toronto's 25-year Meritorious Service Medal in 1977. In 1991, he received the Canadian Research Management Association's Medalist Award and the Alberta Science and Technology Leadership Award. He was a Member of the National Research Council and served on the Executive Committee of the Canadian Association for the World Petroleum Congresses. In 1993, he became an Honorary Fellow of the Chemical Institute of Canada, and in 1994 was installed as a Member of the Order of Canada. In 2014, he was selected as an Honorary Fellow of the Canadian Academy of Engineering.

Bowman was awarded the 2008 Global Energy International Prize by Russian president Dmitri Medvedev.

In 2010, the University of Western Ontario named a CA$50 million national centre for technology commercialization, the Bowman Centre for Sustainable Energy, after him. The Bowman Centre is housed at the university's Western-Sarnia-Lambton Research Park campus. In 2015, the Canadian Chamber of Commerce presented the Canada’s Resources Champion Award to the Bowman Centre.

Bowman was inducted to the Canadian Petroleum Hall of Fame in 2013.

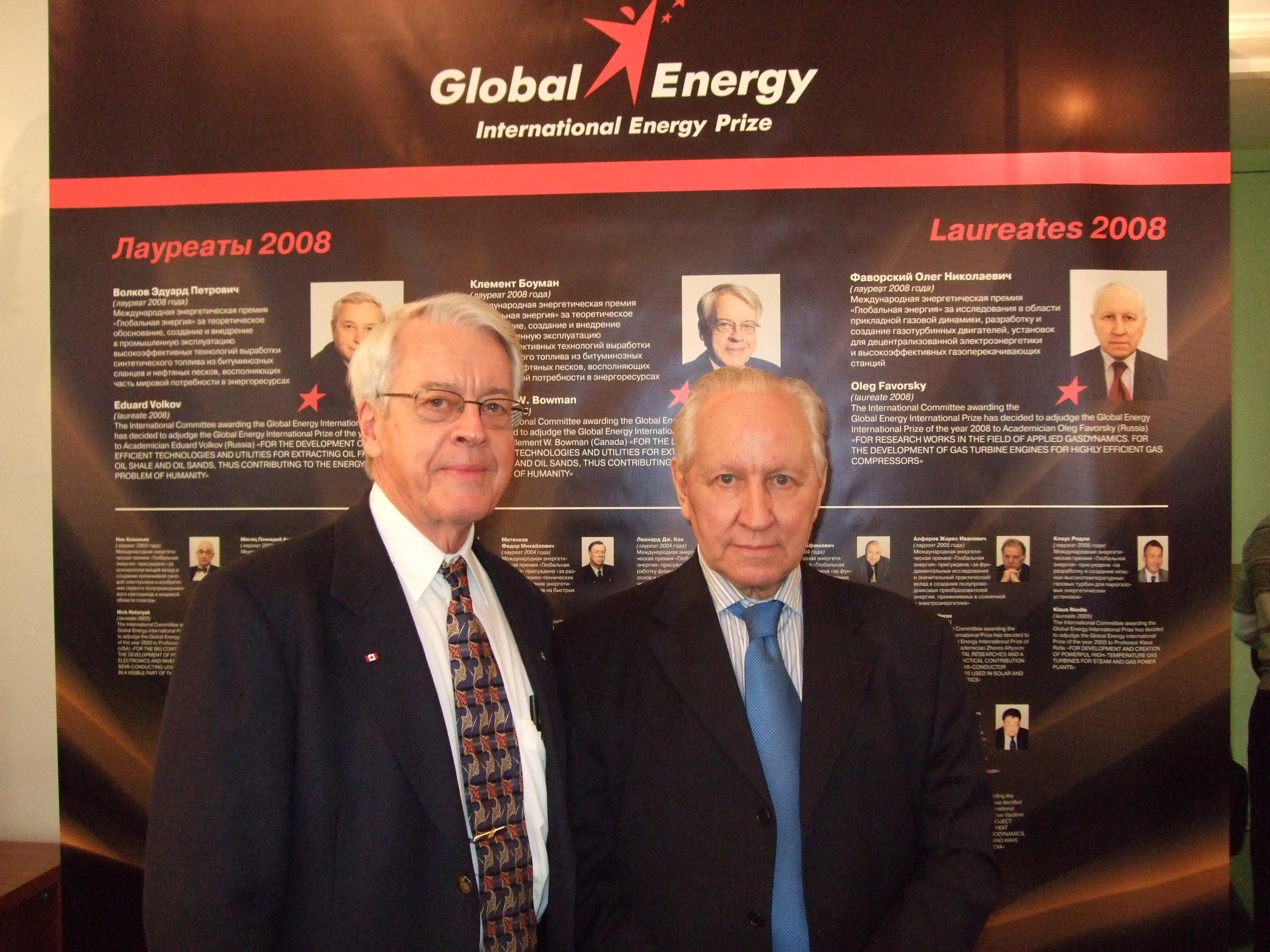
2008 winners of the Global Energy International Prize Clement Bowman and Oleg Favorsky at a press conference in 2008.

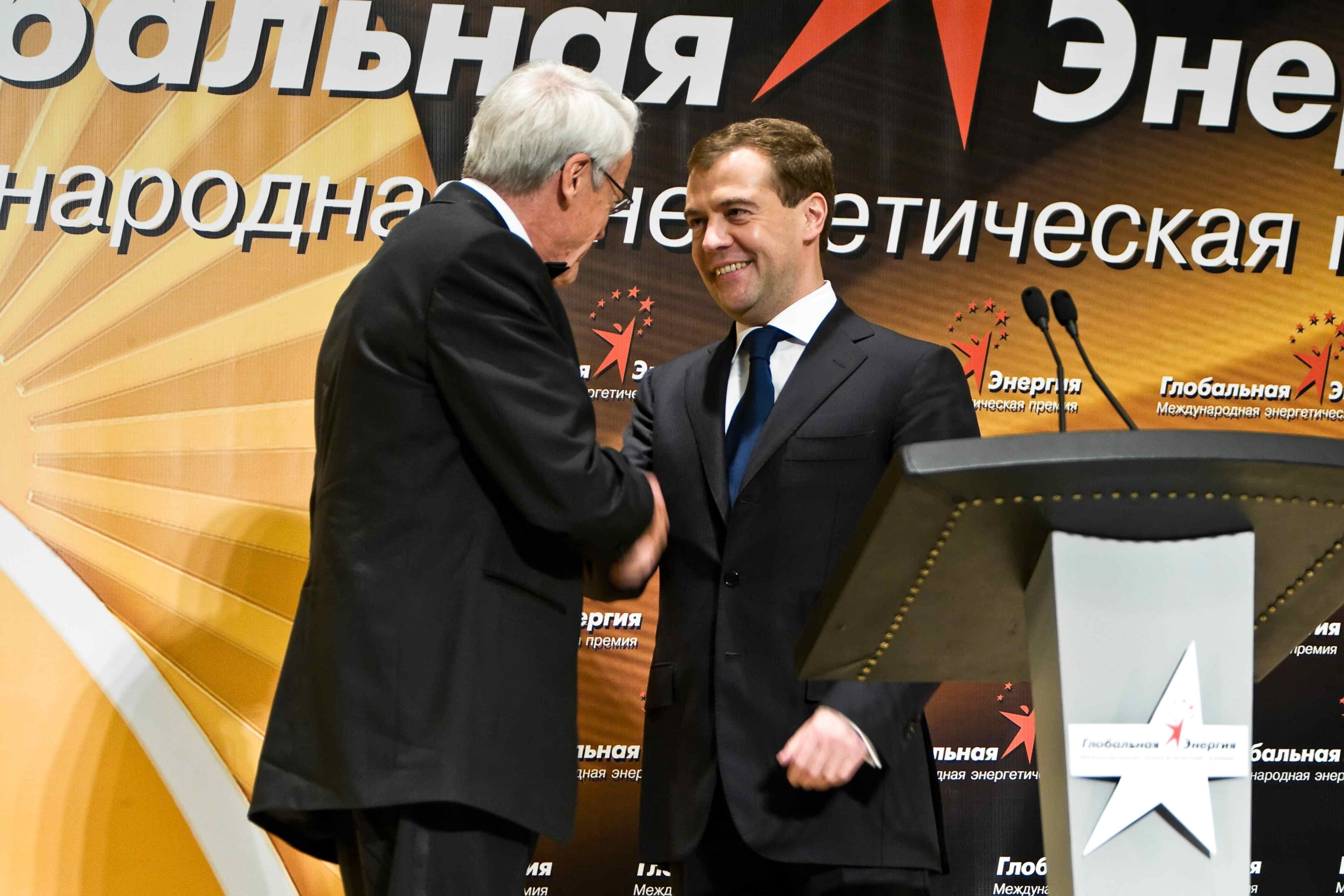
President Medvedev and Bowman at the podium

== Personal life ==
Bowman was born on January 7, 1930, in Toronto, Ontario. After high school, he enrolled in the University of Toronto where he graduated as a chemical engineer in 1952, and later earned his MASc and PhD.

After his retirement, Bowman lived in Sarnia. He remained active with the Bowman Centre and was named to the Mayor’s Honour’s List in 2008. Bowman died in Sarnia on October 7, 2021, at the age of 91.

== Publications ==
- Intangibles: Exploring the Full Depth of Issues, FCIC, Grafiks Marketing & Communications, ISBN 0-9739339-0-9
