= Steam-assisted gravity drainage =

Technology used to produce heavy crude oil and bitumen

Steam-assisted gravity drainage (SAGD; "Sag-D") is an enhanced oil recovery technology for producing heavy crude oil and bitumen. It is an advanced form of steam stimulation in which a pair of horizontal wells are drilled into the oil reservoir, one a few metres above the other. High pressure steam is continuously injected into the upper wellbore to heat the oil and reduce its viscosity, causing the heated oil to drain into the lower wellbore, where it is pumped out. Dr. Roger Butler, engineer at Imperial Oil from 1955 to 1982, invented the steam assisted gravity drainage (SAGD) process in the 1970s. Butler "developed the concept of using horizontal pairs of wells and injected steam to develop certain deposits of bitumen considered too deep for mining". In 1983 Butler became director of technical programs for the Alberta Oil Sands Technology and Research Authority (AOSTRA), a crown corporation created by Alberta Premier Lougheed to promote new technologies for oil sands and heavy crude oil production. AOSTRA quickly supported SAGD as a promising innovation in oil sands extraction technology.

Steam-assisted gravity drainage (SAGD) and cyclic steam stimulation (CSS) steam injection (oil industry) are two commercially applied primal thermal recovery processes used in the oil sands in Geological formation sub-units, such as Grand Rapids Formation, Clearwater Formation, McMurray Formation, General Petroleum Sand, Lloydminster Sand, of the Mannville Group, a stratigraphic range in the Western Canadian Sedimentary Basin.

Steam-assisted gravity drainage is one of the two primary extraction techniques in Alberta's oil sands, the other being strip-mining. While strip-mining is limited to deposits near the surface, steam-assisted gravity drainage technique (SAGD) is better suited to the larger deep deposits that surround the shallow ones. Much of the expected future growth of production in the Canadian oil sands is predicted to be from SAGD.

"Petroleum from the Canadian oil sands extracted via surface mining techniques can consume 20 times more water than conventional oil drilling. As a specific example of an underlying data weakness, this figure excludes the increasingly important steam-assisted gravity drainage technique (SAGD) method."

— The Water-Energy Nexus 2011

Steam Assisted Gravity Drainage emissions are equivalent to what is emitted by the steam flood projects which have long been used to produce heavy oil in California's Kern River Oil Field and elsewhere around the world.

== Description ==
The SAGD process of heavy oil or bitumen production is an enhancement on the steam injection techniques originally developed to produce heavy oil from the Kern River Oil Field of California. The key to all steam flooding processes is to deliver heat to the producing formation to reduce the viscosity of the heavy oil and enable it to move toward the producing well. The cyclic steam stimulation (CSS) process developed for the California heavy oil fields was able to produce oil from some portions of the Alberta oil sands, such as the Cold Lake oil sands, but did not work as well to produce bitumen from heavier and deeper deposits in the Athabasca oil sands and Peace River oil sands, where the majority of Alberta's oil sands reserves lie. To produce these much larger reserves, the SAGD process was developed, primarily by Dr. Roger Butler of Imperial Oil with the assistance of the Alberta Oil Sands Technology and Research Authority and industry partners. The SAGD process is estimated by the National Energy Board to be economic when oil prices are at least US$30 to $35 per barrel.

In the SAGD process, two parallel horizontal oil wells are drilled in the formation, one about 4 to 6 metres above the other. The upper well injects steam, and the lower one collects the heated crude oil or bitumen that flows down due to gravity, plus recovered water from the condensation of the injected steam. The basis of the SAGD process is that thermal communication is established with the reservoir so that the injected steam forms a "steam chamber". The heat from the steam reduces the viscosity of the heavy crude oil or bitumen which allows it to flow down into the lower wellbore. The steam and associated gas rise because of their low density compared to the heavy crude oil below, ensuring that steam is not produced at the lower production well, tend to rise in the steam chamber, filling the void space left by the oil. Associated gas forms, to a certain extent, an insulating heat blanket above (and around) the steam. Oil and water flow is by a countercurrent, gravity driven drainage into the lower well bore. The condensed water and crude oil or bitumen is recovered to the surface by pumps such as progressive cavity pumps that work well for moving high-viscosity fluids with suspended solids.

Sub-cool is the difference between the saturation temperature (boiling point) of water at the producer pressure and the actual temperature at the same place where the pressure is measured. The higher the liquid level above the producer the lower the temperature and higher is the sub-cool. However, real life reservoirs are invariably heterogeneous therefore it becomes extremely difficult to achieve a uniform sub-cool along the entire horizontal length of a well. As a consequence many operators, when faced with uneven stunted steam chamber development, allow a small quantity of steam to enter into the producer to keep the bitumen in the entire wellbore hot hence keeping its viscosity low with the added benefit of transferring heat to colder parts of the reservoir along the wellbore. Another variation sometimes called Partial SAGD is used when operators deliberately circulate steam in the producer following a long shut-in period or as a startup procedure. Though a high value of sub-cool is desirable from a thermal efficiency standpoint as it generally includes reduction of steam injection rates but it also results in slightly reduced production due to a corresponding higher viscosity and lower mobility of bitumen caused by lower temperature. Another drawback of very high sub-cool is the possibility of steam pressure eventually not being enough to sustain steam chamber development above the injector, sometimes resulting in collapsed steam chambers where condensed steam floods the injector and precludes further development of the chamber.

Continuous operation of the injection and production wells at approximately reservoir pressure eliminates the instability problems that plague all high-pressure and cyclic steam processes and SAGD produces a smooth, even production that can be as high as 70% to 80% of oil in place in suitable reservoirs. The process is relatively insensitive to shale streaks and other vertical barriers to steam and fluid flow because, as the rock is heated, differential thermal expansion allows steam and fluids to gravity flow through to the production well. This allows recovery rates of 60% to 70% of oil in place, even in formations with many thin shale barriers. Thermally, SAGD is generally twice as efficient as the older CSS process, and it results in far fewer wells being damaged by the high pressures associated with CSS. Combined with the higher oil recovery rates achieved, this means that SAGD is much more economic than cyclic steam processes where the reservoir is reasonably thick.

== History ==
The gravity drainage idea was originally conceived by Dr. Roger Butler, an engineer for Imperial Oil in the 1970s In 1975 Imperial Oil transferred Butler from Sarnia, Ontario to Calgary, Alberta to head their heavy oil research effort. He tested the concept with Imperial Oil in 1980, in a pilot at Cold Lake which featured one of the first horizontal wells in the industry, with vertical injectors.

=== Alberta Oil Sands Technology and Research Authority (AOSTRA) 1974 ===
In 1974, Premier of Alberta Peter Lougheed created the Alberta Oil Sands Technology and Research Authority (AOSTRA) as an Alberta crown corporation to promote the development and use of new technology for oil sands and heavy crude oil production, and enhanced recovery of conventional crude oil. Its first facility was owned and operated by ten industrial participants and received ample government support (Deutsch and McLennan 2005) including from the Alberta Heritage Savings Trust Fund. One of the main targets of AOSTRA finding of suitable technologies for that part of the Athabasca oil sands that could not be recovered using conventional surface mining technologies.

==== AOSTRA Underground Test Facility 1984 ====
In 1984, AOSTRA initiated the Underground Test Facility in the Athabasca oil sands, located between the MacKay Rivers and the Devon River west of the Syncrude plant as an in-situ SAGD bitumen recovery facility. It was here that their first test of twin (horizontal) SAGD wells took place, proving the feasibility of the concept, briefly achieving positive cash flow in 1992 at a production rate of about 2,000 barrels per day (320 m^{3}/d) from three well pairs.

=== Foster Creek ===
The Foster Creek plant in Alberta Canada, built in 1996 and operated by Cenovus Energy, was the first commercial Steam-assisted gravity drainage (SAGD) project and by 2010 Foster Creek "became the largest commercial SAGD project in Alberta to reach royalty payout status. "

The original UTF SAGD wells were drilled horizontally from a tunnel in the limestone underburden, accessed with vertical mine shafts. The concept coincided with development of directional drilling techniques that allowed companies to drill horizontal wells accurately, cheaply and efficiently, to the point that it became hard to justify drilling a conventional vertical well any more. With the low cost of drilling horizontal well pairs, and the very high recovery rates of the SAGD process (up to 60% of the oil in place), SAGD is economically attractive to oil companies.

At Foster Creek Cenovus has employed its patented 'wedge well' technology to recover residual resources bypassed by regular SAGD operations, this improves the total recovery rate of the operation. The 'wedge well' technology works by accessing the residual bitumen that is bypassed in regular SAGD operations by drilling an infill well between two established operating SAGD well pairs once the SAGD steam chambers have matured to the point where they have merged and are in fluid communication and then what is left to recover in that reservoir area between the operating SAGD well pairs is a 'wedge' of residual, bypassed oil. Wedge well technology has been shown to improve overall recovery rates by 5%-10% at a reduced capital cost as less steam is required once the steam chambers mature to the point where they are in fluid communication and typically at this stage in the recovery process, also commonly known as the 'blow down' phase, the injected steam is replaced with a non-condensable gas such as methane, further reducing production costs.

== Current applications ==
This technology was not at-first commercially viable. It became so during the increased oil prices during the 2000s. While traditional drilling methods were prevalent up until the 1990s, high crude prices of the 21st Century are encouraging more unconventional methods (such as SAGD) to extract crude oil. The Canadian oil sands have many SAGD projects in progress, since this region is home of one of the largest deposits of bitumen in the world (Canada and Venezuela have the world's largest deposits).

The SAGD process allowed the Alberta Energy Resources Conservation Board (ERCB) to increase its proven oil reserves to 179 billion barrels, which raised Canada's oil reserves to the third highest in the world after Venezuela and Saudi Arabia and approximately quadrupled North American oil reserves. As of 2011, the oil sands reserves stand at around 169 billion barrels.

== Disadvantages ==
=== Oil and water nexus ===
SAGD, a thermal recovery process, consumes large quantities of water and natural gas.

"Petroleum from the Canadian oil sands extracted via surface mining techniques can consume 20 times more water than conventional oil drilling. As a specific example of an underlying data weakness, this figure excludes the increasingly important steam-assisted gravity drainage technique (SAGD) method. We encourage future researchers to fill this hole.

— The Water-Energy Nexus 2011

However, by 2011 there was inadequate data on the amount of water used in the increasingly important steam-assisted gravity drainage technique (SAGD) method. Evaporators can treat the SAGD produced water to produce high quality freshwater for reuse in SAGD operations. However, evaporators produce a high volume blowdown waste which requires further management.

=== Use of natural gas for steam generation ===
As in all thermal recovery processes, cost of steam generation is a major part of the cost of oil production. Historically, natural gas has been used as a fuel for Canadian oil sands projects, due to the presence of large stranded gas reserves in the oil sands area. However, with the building of natural gas pipelines to outside markets in Canada and the United States, the price of gas has become an important consideration. The fact that natural gas production in Canada has peaked and is now declining is also a problem. Other sources of generating heat are under consideration, notably gasification of the heavy fractions of the produced bitumen to produce syngas, using the nearby (and massive) deposits of coal, or even building nuclear reactors to produce the heat.

=== Use of water for steam generation ===
A source of large amounts of fresh and brackish water and large water re-cycling facilities are required in order to create the steam for the SAGD process. Water is a popular topic for debate in regards to water use and management. As of 2008, American petroleum production (not limited to SAGD) generates over 5 billion gallons of produced water every day. The concern of using large amounts of water has little to do with proportion of water used, rather the quality of the water. Traditionally close to 70 million cubic metres of the water volume that was used in the SAGD process was fresh, surface, water. There has been a significant reduction in fresh water use as of 2010, when approximately 18 million cubic metres were used. Though to offset the drastic reduction in fresh water use, industry has begun to significantly increase the volume of saline groundwater involved. This, as well as other, more general water saving techniques have allowed surface water usage by oil sands operations to decrease by more than threefold since production first began. Relying upon gravity drainage, SAGD also requires comparatively thick and homogeneous reservoirs, and so is not suitable for all heavy-oil production areas.

== Alternative methods ==
By 2009 the two commercially applied primal thermal recovery processes, steam-assisted gravity drainage (SAGD) and cyclic steam stimulation (CSS), were used in oil sands production in the Clearwater and Lower Grand Rapids Formations in the Cold Lake Area in Alberta.

=== Cyclic steam stimulation (CSS) ===
Canadian Natural Resources employs cyclic steam or "huff and puff" technology to develop bitumen resources. This technology requires one well bore and the production consists of the injection to fracture and heat the formation prior to the production phases. First steam is injected above the formation fracture point for several weeks or months, mobilizing cold bitumen, the well is then shut in for several weeks or months to allow the steam to soak into the formation. Then the flow on the injection well is reversed producing oil through the same injection well bore. The injection and production phases together comprise one cycle. Steam is re-injected to begin a new cycle when oil production rates fall below a critical threshold due to the cooling of the reservoir. Cyclic steam stimulation also has a number of CSS Follow-up or Enhancement Processes, including Pressure Up and Blow Down (PUBD), Mixed Well Steam Drive and Drainage (MWSDD), Vapor Extraction (Vapex), Liquid Addition to Steam for Enhanced Recovery of Bitumen (LASER) and HPCSS Assisted SAGD and Hybrid Process.

=== High pressure cyclic steam stimulation (HPCSS) ===
"Roughly 35 per cent of all in situ production in the Alberta oil sands uses a technique called high pressure cyclic steam stimulation (HPCSS), which cycles between two phases: first, steam is injected into an underground oil sands deposit to fracture and heat the formation to soften the bitumen just like CSS does, excepting at even higher pressures; then, the cycle switches to production where the resulting hot mixture of bitumen and steam (called a "bitumen emulsion") is pumped up to the surface through the same well, again just like CSS, until the resulting pressure drop slows production to an uneconomical stage. The process is then repeated multiple times." An Alberta Energy Regulator (AER) news release explained the difference between high pressure cyclic steam stimulation (HPCSS) and steam assisted gravity drainage (SAGD). "HPCSS has been used in oil recovery in Alberta for more than 30 years. The method involves injecting high-pressure steam, well above the ambient reservoir pressure, into a reservoir over a prolonged period of time. As heat softens the bitumen and water dilutes and separates the bitumen from the sand, the pressure creates fractures, cracks and openings through which the bitumen can flow back into the steam-injector wells. HPCSS differs from steam assisted gravity drainage (SAGD) operations where steam is continuously injected at lower pressures without fracturing the reservoir and uses gravity drainage as the primary recovery mechanism." In some cases satellite radar InSAR techniques were used to monitor surface deformation associated with the oil extraction.

In the Clearwater Formation near Cold Lake, Alberta the high pressure cyclic steam stimulation (HPCSS) is used. There are both horizontal and vertical wells. Injection is at fracture pressure. There is a 60 m to 180 m spacing for horizontal wells. Vertical wells are spaced at 2 to 8 Acre spacing for vertical wells. The development can be as low as 7 m net pay. It is used in areas generally with no to minimal bottom water or top gas. The CSOR is 3.3 to 4.5. The ultimate recovery is predicted at 15 to 35%. SAGD thermal recovery method is also used in Clearwater and Lower Grand Rapids Formations with Horizontal Well Pairs (700 to 1000 m), Operating pressure 3 to 5 MPa, Burnt Lake SAGD was started with higher operating pressure close to dilation pressure, 75 m to 120 m spacing, Development to as low as 10 m net pay, In areas with or without bottom water, CSOR: 2.8 to 4.0 (at 100% quality), Predicted ultimate recovery: 45% to 55%.

Canadian Natural Resources Limited's (CNRL) Primrose and Wolf Lake in situ oil sands project near Cold Lake, Alberta in the Clearwater Formation, operated by CNRL subsidiary Horizon Oil Sands, use the high pressure cyclic steam stimulation (HPCSS).

=== Vapor extraction (Vapex) ===
Alternative enhanced oil recovery mechanisms include VAPEX (Vapor Assisted Petroleum Extraction), Electro-Thermal Dynamic Stripping Process (ET-DSP), and ISC (for In Situ Combustion). VAPEX, a "gravity-drainage process that uses vapourized solvents rather than steam to displace or produce heavy oil and reduce its viscosity, was also invented by Butler.

ET-DSP is a patented process that uses electricity to heat oil sands deposits to mobilize bitumen allowing production using simple vertical wells. ISC uses oxygen to generate heat that diminishes oil viscosity; alongside carbon dioxide generated by heavy crude oil displace oil toward production wells. One ISC approach is called THAI for Toe to Heel Air Injection. The THAI facility in Saskatchewan was purchased in 2017 by Proton Technologies Canada Inc., who has demonstrated separation of pure hydrogen at this site. Proton's goal is to leave the carbon in the ground and extract only the hydrogen from hydrocarbons.

=== Enhanced Modified Steam and Gas Push (eMSAGP) ===
eMSAGP is a MEG Energy patented process wherein MEG, in partnership with Cenovus, developed a modified recovery process dubbed “enhanced Modified Steam and Gas Push” (eMSAGP), a modification of SAGP designed to improve the thermal efficiency of SAGD by utilizing additional producers located midway between adjacent SAGD well pairs, at the elevation of the SAGD producers. These additional producers, commonly referred to as “infill” wells, are an integral part of the eMSAGP recovery system.

== See also ==
- Enhanced oil recovery
- Heavy crude oil
- Oil sands
- Oil shale
- Mazut
