= Boulder Creek Formation =

- Stratigraphic range: Early Cretaceous (Albian)
- Type: Formation
- Unit of: Fort St. John Group
- Underlies: Hasler Formation
- Overlies: Hulcross Formation
- Thickness: Up to 171 metres (560 ft)

Lithology
- Primary: Sandstone, conglomerate
- Other: Carbonaceous shale, siltstone

Location
- Region: British Columbia
- Country: Canada

Type section
- Named for: A tributary to Commotion Creek
- Named by: E.M.Spieker, 1921.

The Boulder Creek Formation is a geologic formation in northeastern British Columbia. It was named for a tributary to Commotion Creek in the Pine Pass area by E.M. Spieker in 1921. At one time considered to be a member of the Commotion Formation, it was elevated to formation status by D.F. Stott in 1982.

The formation was deposited in shallow marine to shoreline environments during the Albian stage of the Early Cretaceous period. It preserves ammonites, plant remains, and other fossils.

== Lithology and environment of deposition ==
The Boulder Creek Formation records the transition from marine conditions, represented by the shales of the underlying Hulcross Formation, to continental environments, with a return to marine conditions marked by the shales of the overlying Hasler Formation. Near shore and shoreface deposits consist of massive, fine grained, well sorted sandstones, and massive, silica-cemented conglomerates of quartz and chert pebbles in a matrix of coarse sand. Delta plain and floodplain deposits consist of interbedded argillaceous sandstones, carbonaceous shales and thin coal beds.

== Thickness and distribution ==
Outcrops of the Boulder Creek Formation can be seen along the Peace River eastward from Hudson's Hope, and it is present in the subsurface in the Peace River plains to the east. It is well exposed in the foothills of the Canadian Rockies between the Peace and Wapiti Rivers, where it reaches thicknesses of up to 171 metres (560 ft). It can be traced southward through the foothills almost as far the Kakwa River near the British Columbia-Alberta boundary.

== Relationship to other units ==
The Boulder Creek Formation is part of the Fort St. John Group. Originally described as a member of the Commotion Formation, the Boulder Creek was elevated to formational status along with the other members of the Commotion by D.F. Stott in 1982, who proposed that the term 'Commotion Formation' be abandoned.

The Boulder Creek Formation conformably overlies the marine shales of the Hulcross Formation, and is conformably overlain by the marine shales of the Hasler Formation. It is equivalent to the Cadotte Member, and possibly the Paddy Member, of the Peace River Formation of the Peace River plains. It correlates with the middle part of the Buckinghorse Formation in the Muskwa River area, and with the Tussock Member of the Scatter Formation in the Liard River area. Equivalent beds may be present above the coal-bearing strata near Grande Cache.

== See also ==
- List of fossiliferous stratigraphic units in British Columbia
