= Hamburg (oil field) =

Remote area in north-western Alberta, Canada

Hamburg/Chinchaga
- Location within Alberta
- Country: Canada
- Region: Northern Alberta
- Offshore/onshore: onshore
- Coordinates: 57.3°N 119°W
- Operators: APA Corporation, Devon Energy

Field history
- Discovery: 1983

Production
- Producing formations: Bluesky Formation, Gething Formation

The Hamburg oil field is a remote area in north-western Alberta, Canada, with intensive exploration and production of oil and gas. It was discovered in 1983.

The closest town is Manning, at 180 km east.

Drilling activity is especially intensive during the winter months, when the otherwise soft muskeg can be crossed on winter roads.

Among the companies that have a large interest in the area are Devon Energy, APA Corporation, and Occidental Petroleum.

== Access ==
- West on the Chinhchaga Forestry Road from Highway 35
- Through the Hamburg Aerodrome

== See also ==
- Canadian oil patch
