= Spirit River Formation =

Stratigraphic unit in Canada

- Stratigraphic range: middle Albian
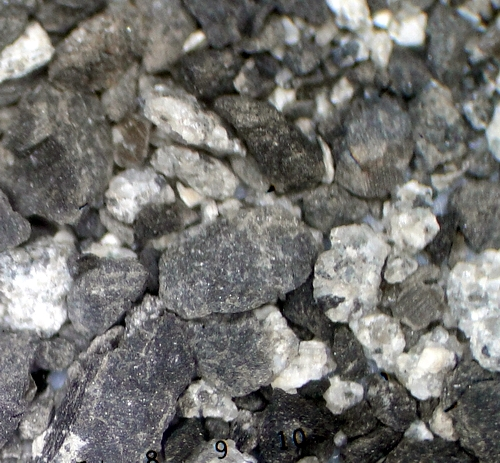
- Falher graywake and shale
- Type: Geological formation
- Unit of: Fort St. John Group
- Sub-units: Notikewin Member, Falher Member, Wilrich Member
- Underlies: Peace River Formation
- Overlies: Bluesky Formation
- Thickness: up to 348 feet (110 m)

Lithology
- Primary: Sandstone, shale, siltstone
- Other: Coal, ironstone, greywacke

Location
- Coordinates: 55.775°N 118.906°W
- Region: Alberta, British Columbia
- Country: Canada

Type section
- Named for: Spirit River
- Named by: Badgley, 1952

The Spirit River Formation is a stratigraphic unit of middle Albian age in the Western Canadian Sedimentary Basin.

It takes the name from the Spirit River, and was first described in Imperial Oil Spirit River No. 1 well by Badgley in 1952.

== Lithology ==
The Spirit River Formation consists, from bottom to top of fine to medium grained argillaceous sandstone, dark shale, ironstone, greywacke, shale, siltstone, coal and dark shale with thin sandstone and siltstone stringers.

=== Hydrocarbon production ===
Gas is produced from channels developed in the Falher Member in northern Alberta.

== Hydraulic fracturing in Canada ==
'Massive' hydraulic fracturing has been widely used in Alberta since the late 1970s to recover gas from low-permeability sandstones of the Spirit River Formation. Massive hydraulic fracturing has been widely used in Alberta since the late 1970s. The method is currently used in development of the Cardium, Duvernay, Montney and Viking formations in Alberta, Bakken formation in Saskatchewan, Montney and Horn River formations in British Columbia.

== Distribution ==
The Spirit River Formation reaches a maximum thickness of 348 metres (1,140 ft). It is found in the sub-surface in the Peace River Country, in an area stretching from Fort St. John, British Columbia to the Lesser Slave Lake from west to east, and from Grande Prairie, Alberta to Manning, Alberta from south to north.

== Relationship to other units ==
The Spirit River Formation is conformably overlain by the Peace River Formation and conformably underlain by the Bluesky Formation. It grades laterally to the Buckinghorse Formation shales to the north-east, and into the sandy facies of the Malcolm Creek Formation south of the Wapiti River. It is equivalent to the upper Mannville Formation in Central Alberta and to the Clearwater Formation and Grand Rapids Formation in the upper Athabasca River area.

=== Subdivisions ===
The Spirit River Formation is composed of the following sub-divisions from base to top:

Sub-unit	Lithology	Max. thickness	Reference
Notikewin Member	fine to medium grained argillaceous sandstone, dark shale, ironstone	28 metres (90 ft)	
Falher Member	greywacke, shale, siltstone, coal	215 metres (710 ft)	
Wilrich Member	dark shales thin sandstone and siltstone stringers	154 metres (510 ft)	
