= Ellerslie =

Ellerslie may refer to:

== Places ==
=== Australia and New Zealand ===
- Ellerslie, New South Wales, Australia
- Ellerslie, New Zealand, a suburb of Auckland
- Ellerslie, Victoria, a town in the Shire of Moyne, Victoria, Australia

=== Canada ===
- Ellerslie, Prince Edward Island, a community in eastern Canada
- Ellerslie, Edmonton (area), a suburban area in Edmonton
  - Ellerslie, Edmonton, a neighbourhood within this area
  - Ellerslie Road, Edmonton, Alberta

=== United Kingdom ===
- Ellerslie, Oxford, the original name of Dorset House in Oxford, England
- Ellerslie Global Residence, a student accommodation at University of Leeds

=== United States ===
- Ellerslie (Millbrook, Alabama), listed on the National Register of Historic Places (NRHP) in Elmore County, Alabama
- Ellerslie, Georgia, an unincorporated community
- Ellerslie, Maryland, a small town in Allegany County
- Ellerslie (Glenwood, Maryland), a historic slave plantation
- Ellerslie (Port Tobacco, Maryland), listed on the NRHP
- Ellerslie (Linden, North Carolina), listed on the NRHP
- Ellerslie (Colonial Heights, Virginia), listed on the NRHP

== Other ==
- Ellerslie Member, a stratigraphical unit in the Western Canadian Sedimentary Basin
- Ellerslie School (disambiguation)
