= Bluesky Formation =

Stratigraphic unit in Canada

- Stratigraphic range: Lower Albian
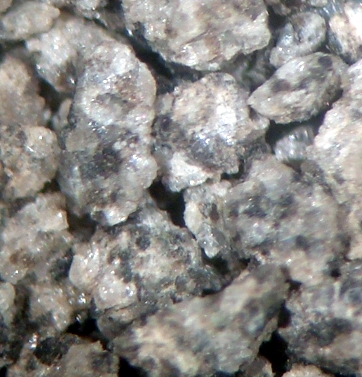
- Bluesky Sandstone
- Type: Geological formation
- Unit of: Fort St. John Group
- Underlies: Wilrich Member
- Overlies: Gething Formation
- Thickness: up to 46 metres (150 ft)

Lithology
- Primary: Sandstone

Location
- Coordinates: 56.0442°N 118.1274°W
- Region: Western Alberta
- Country: Canada

Type section
- Named for: Bluesky, Alberta
- Named by: Peter C. Badgley, 1952

The Bluesky Formation is a stratigraphic unit of Lower Cretaceous age in the Western Canada Sedimentary Basin. It takes its name from the hamlet of Bluesky, and was first described in Shell's Bluesky No. 1 well by Badgley in 1952.

== Lithology and Depositional Environment ==
The formation is composed of mudstones, conglomerates and sandstones which can be quartzose or contain chert grains. Many of the Bluesky sandstones do not display bedding features although some low and moderate-angle large scale cross-bedding has been observed in some sections. The sediments were deposited in both marginally marine nearshore and fully marine offshore settings following a transgression of the ancient Moosebar Sea. Bluesky sediments are separated from Gething strata by a scoured or loaded contact and occasionally by a burrowed Glossifungites surface. The Bluesky Formation can be very porous and produces hydrocarbons in many areas across Western Canada. Heavy oil is produced from the Bluesky formation in the Peace River area.

== Distribution ==
The Bluesky Formation reaches a thickness of 46 meters (151 ft) in the Pouce Coupe area, and thins out toward north and west. Thin sands can be found in the Peace River area.

== Relationship with other units ==
Although some early workers included the Bluesky Formation in the Bullhead Group, it is usually classified as the basal unit of the Fort St. John Group. It is conformably overlain by the Wilrich Member of the Spirit River Formation and conformably underlain by the Gething Formation. Northeast of the town of Peace River it was deposited unconformably on Mississippian limestone. It is equivalent with the Glauconitic Sandstone of the Mannville Group in central and southern Alberta, as well as with the Wabiskaw Member of the Clearwater Formation in the eastern part of northern Alberta.

== Bitumen Deposits ==
The Bluesky deposit of bitumen comes from the "clean estuarine reservoir sands of the Cretaceous-age Bluesky Formation" in the Peace River. Secondary production area is the Gething Formation. The combined Bluesky-Gething deposit is the primary target area for oil sands development in the Peace River area. There is a reservoir at about 600 m (2,000 ft)–700 m (2,300 ft) below the surface. Heavy oil in the Peace River, produced from bitumen deposit is extracted using wells not by mining.

The oil sands of the Bluesky-Gething were deposited during the Cretaceous Period within a transgressive system, with the lower fluvial to nonmarine Gething Formation at the base and the estuarine Bluesky Formation at the top. Deposition of the Bluesky-Gething reservoir and nonreservoir units was controlled by topography of the pre-Cretaceous unconformity. The Red Earth Highlands separate the Bluesky-Gething into northeast and southwest accumulations and includes part of the Seal Lake area. In the Peace River oil sands areas, the Bluesky-Gething is overlain by the marine shales of the Wilrich Member.

— AER March 2014
