= Ostracod Limestone =

Ostracod Limestone may refer to:

- Kilmaluag Formation or Ostracod Limestone, a Middle Jurassic geologic formation in Scotland
- Ostracod Beds or Ostracod Limestone, a subunit of the Mannville Group, a stratigraphical unit of Cretaceous age in the Western Canadian Sedimentary Basin

== See also ==
- Fossiliferous limestone
- Ostracod
