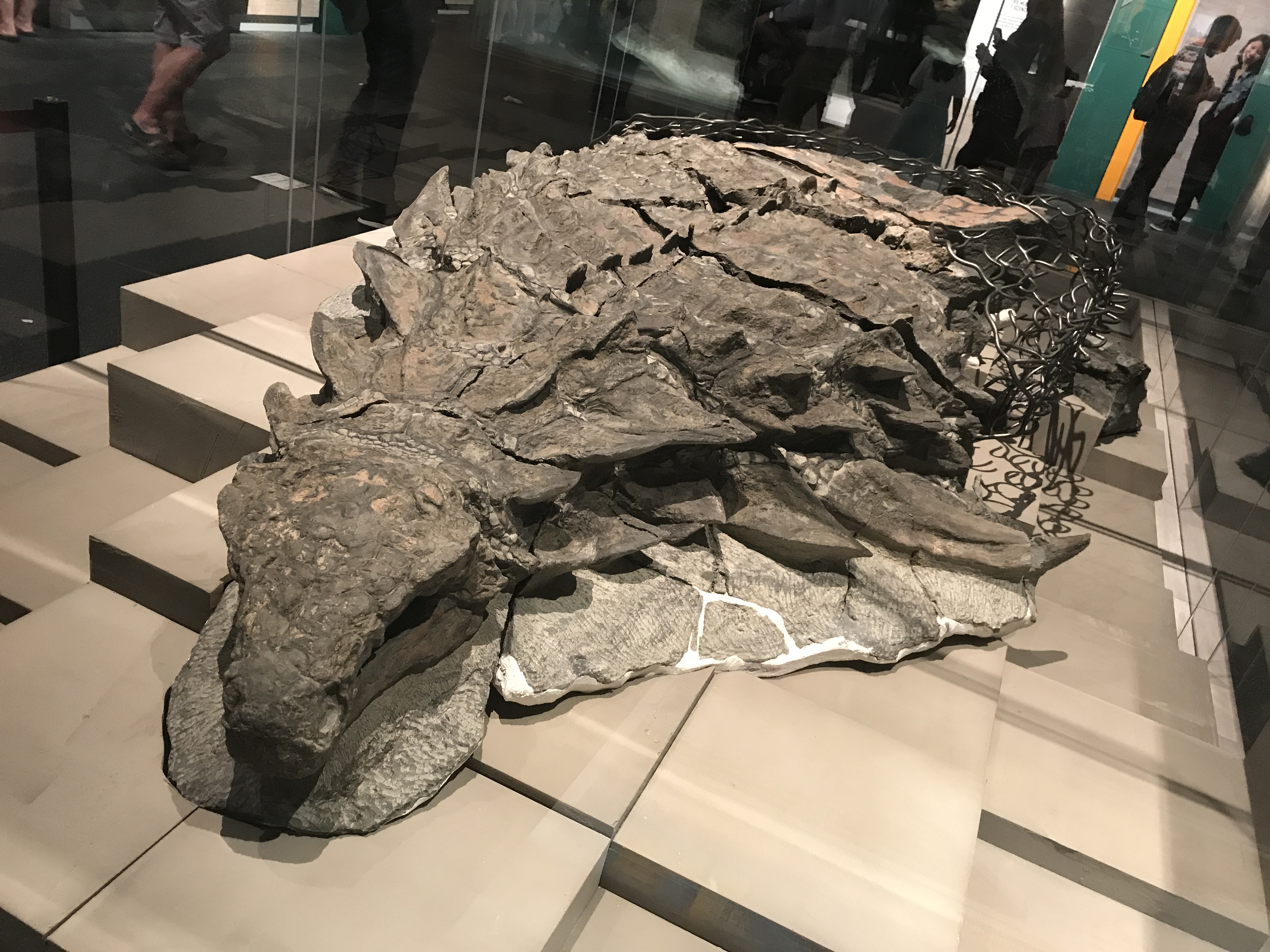
- The holotype specimen on display at the Royal Tyrell Museum

Scientific classification
- Kingdom: Animalia
- Phylum: Chordata
- Class: Reptilia
- Clade: Dinosauria
- Clade: †Ornithischia
- Clade: †Thyreophora
- Clade: †Ankylosauria
- Family: †Nodosauridae
- Subfamily: †Nodosaurinae
- Genus: †Borealopelta; Brown et al., 2017
- Species: †B. markmitchelli

Binomial name
- †Borealopelta markmitchelli Brown et al., 2017

= Borealopelta =

Borealopelta Temporal range: Early Cretaceous, Albian

Extinct genus of dinosaurs

Borealopelta (meaning 'northern shield') is an extinct genus of herbivorous nodosaurid ankylosaur from the Lower Cretaceous of what is today Alberta, Canada. It contains a single species, B. markmitchelli, named in 2017 by Caleb Brown and colleagues from a well-preserved specimen known as the Suncor nodosaur. Discovered at an oil sands mine north of Fort McMurray, Alberta, the specimen is remarkable for being among the best-preserved dinosaur fossils of its size ever found. It preserved not only the armor (osteoderms) in their life positions, but also remains of their keratin sheaths, overlying skin, and stomach contents from the animal's last meal. Melanosomes were also found that indicate the animal had a reddish pinkish skin tone.

== Discovery and history ==
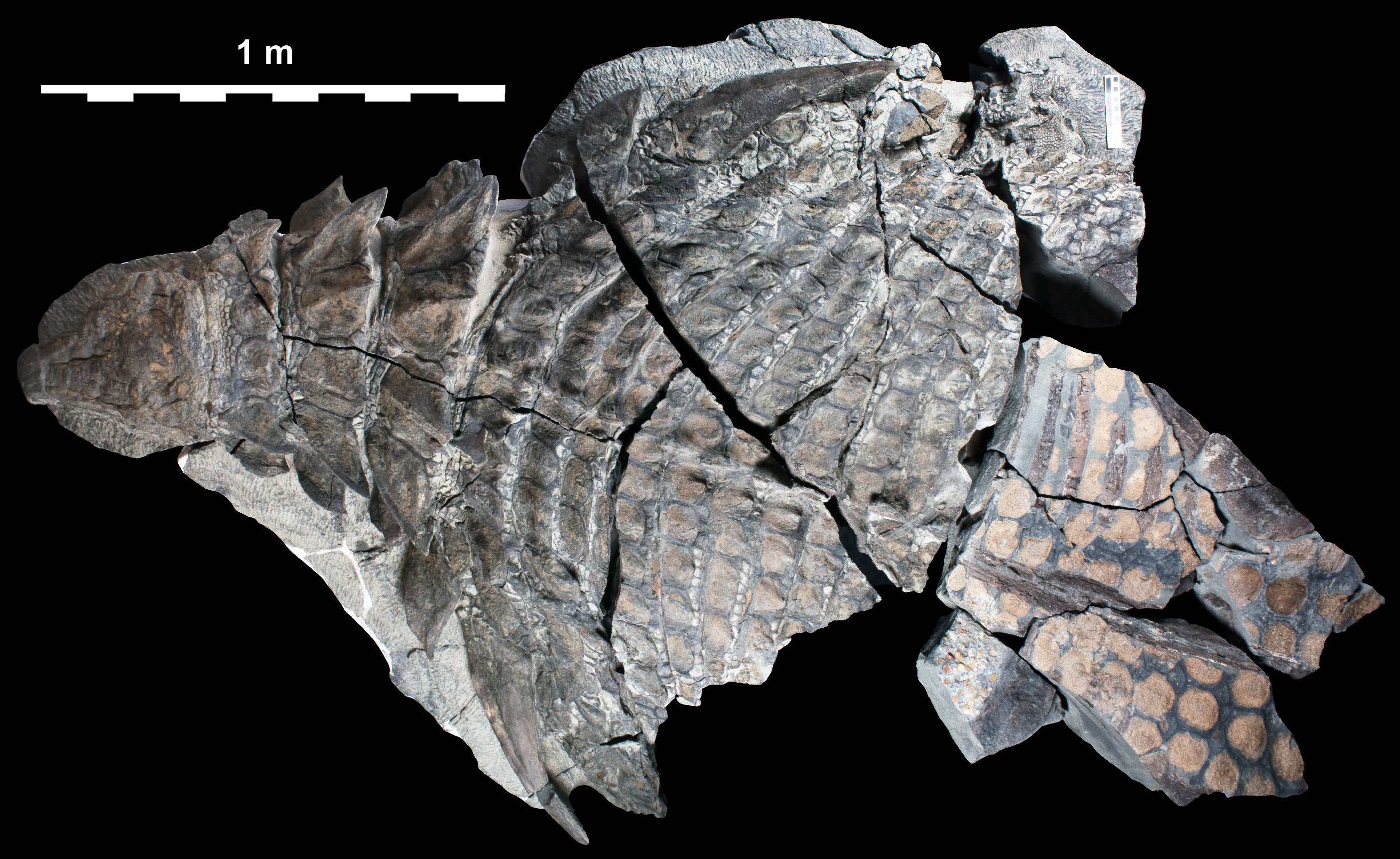
Holotype shown from above

The holotype specimen was uncovered on March 21, 2011, at the Millennium Mine, an oil sands mine 30 kilometres (19 mi) north of Fort McMurray, Alberta, that is owned and operated by Suncor Energy. It was discovered by a miner, Shawn Funk, who was digging in the bank and noticed the specimen. The Wabiskaw Member sediments (belonging to the Clearwater Formation) were being removed to allow mining of the underlying bitumen-rich sands of the McMurray Formation when an excavator struck the fossil. Noting the unusual nature of the exposed fragments, the operators alerted the Royal Tyrrell Museum of Palaeontology. In accordance with Suncor's mining permit and Alberta fossil law, the specimen became the property of the Alberta government.

On March 23, Royal Tyrrell Museum scientist Donald Henderson and senior technician Darren Tanke were brought to the mine to examine the specimen, which, based on photographs, they expected to be a plesiosaur or another marine reptile, as no land animals had ever been discovered in the oil sands previously. Upon correct identification, which was made on-site by Tanke, Henderson was astonished to learn that it was an ankylosaurian dinosaur and not a marine reptile. The animal had apparently been washed out to sea after death.

After three days of mine safety training, museum staff and Suncor employees began working to recover all pieces of the fossil. Aside from the several pieces broken free, the bulk of the specimen was still embedded 8 metres (26 ft) up a cliff that was 12 metres (39 ft) high. The process took fourteen days in total.

As the major piece of rock containing the fossil was being lifted out, it broke under its own weight into several pieces. Museum staff salvaged the specimen by wrapping and stabilizing the pieces in plaster, after which they were able to successfully transport them to the Royal Tyrell Museum. There, technician Mark Mitchell spent six years removing the adhering rock and preparing the fossil for study, which was sponsored by the National Geographic Society. The species B. markmitchelli was named for him in recognition of his skilled work. The specimen was put on public exhibit on May 12, 2017, as part of the Royal Tyrrell Museum's "Grounds for Discovery" exhibition, along with other specimens discovered via industrial activity.

== Description ==
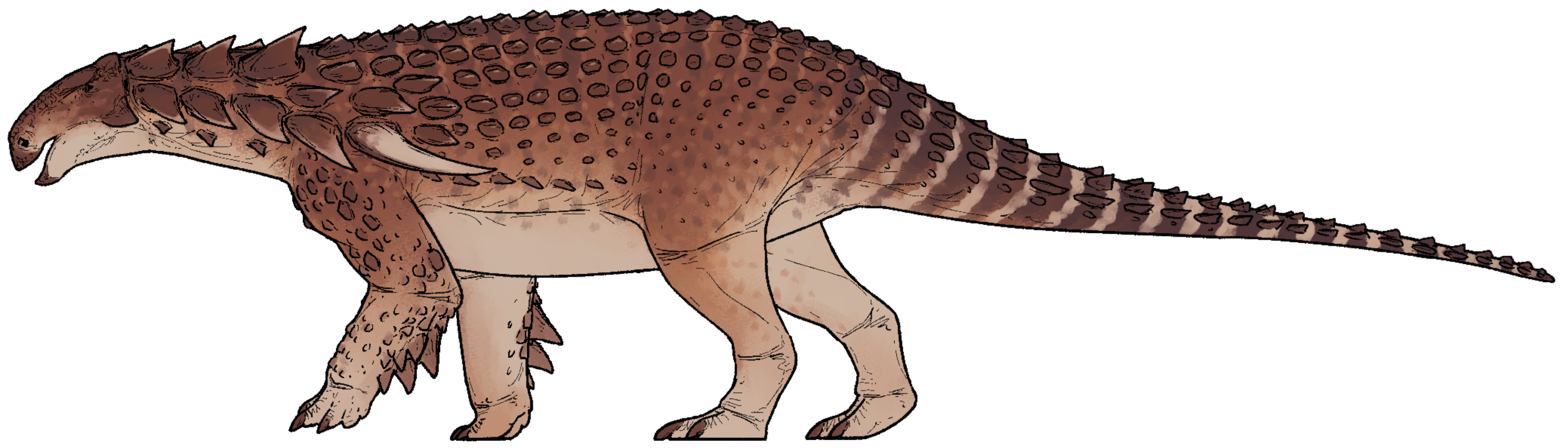
Restoration

Borealopelta was a large dinosaur, measuring 5.5 metres (18 ft) long and weighing 1.3 metric tons (1.4 short tons). The Suncor specimen is remarkable for its three-dimensional preservation of a large, articulated dinosaur complete with soft tissue. While many small dinosaurs have been preserved with traces of soft tissues and skin, they are usually flattened and compressed during fossilization. Similar-looking hadrosaurid "mummies" have a shriveled, desiccated appearance, due to their partial mummification before fossilization. The Suncor specimen, however, appears to have sunk upside-down onto the sea floor shortly after its death, causing the top half of the body to be quickly buried with minimal distortion. The result is a specimen that preserves the animal almost as it would have looked in life, without flattening or shriveling.

The Suncor specimen preserved numerous closely spaced rows of small armor plates, or osteoderms, lining the top and sides of its broad body. It had a straight tail rather than a tail club, unlike any ankylosaurids, and from the shoulders protruded a pair of long spines, shaped like the horns of a bull. Study of the pigments present in remnants of skin and scales suggests that it might have had a reddish-brown coloration in life, with a countershaded pattern that was used for camouflage.

== Classification ==
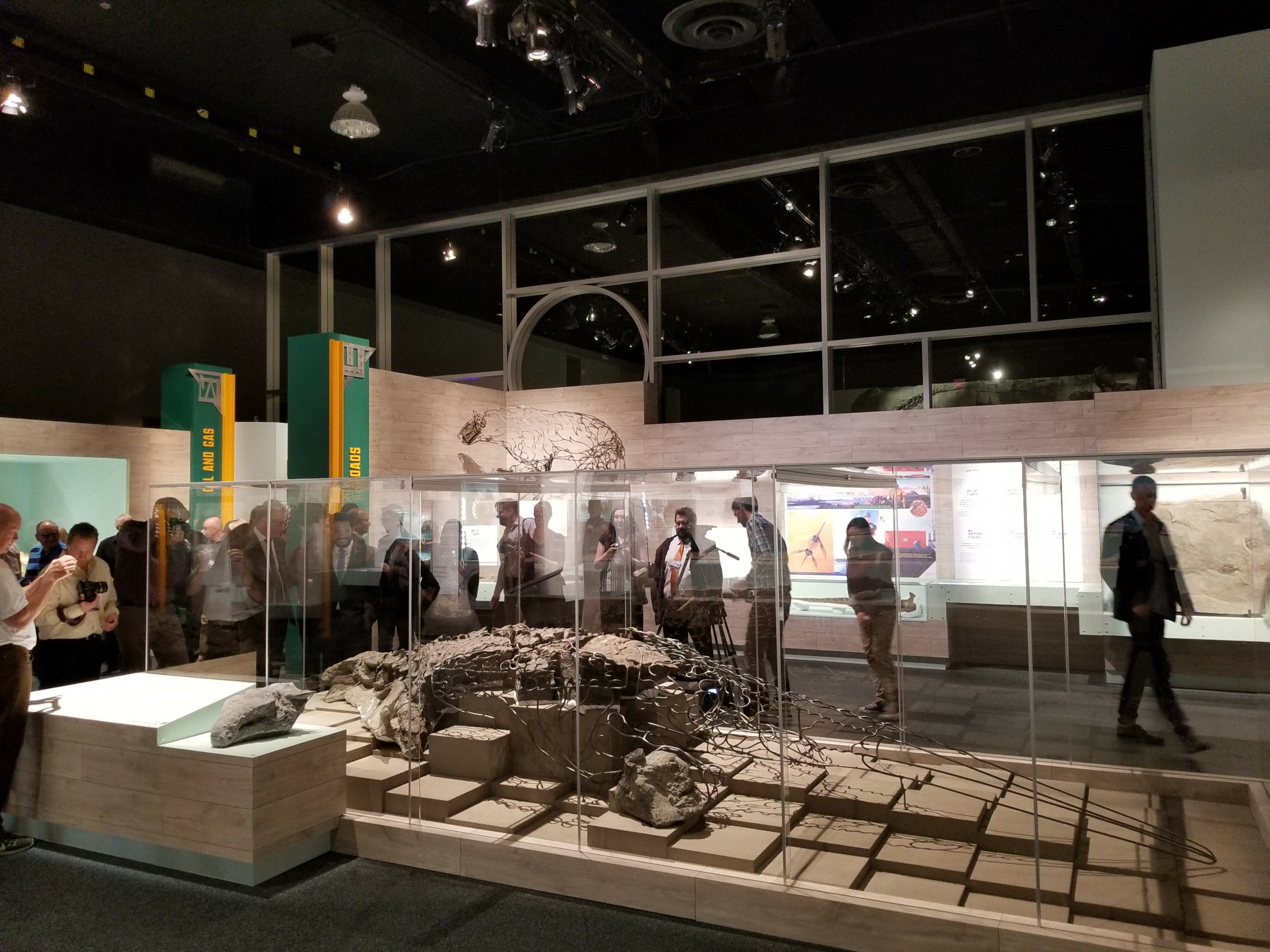
Side view of its display case at the museum.

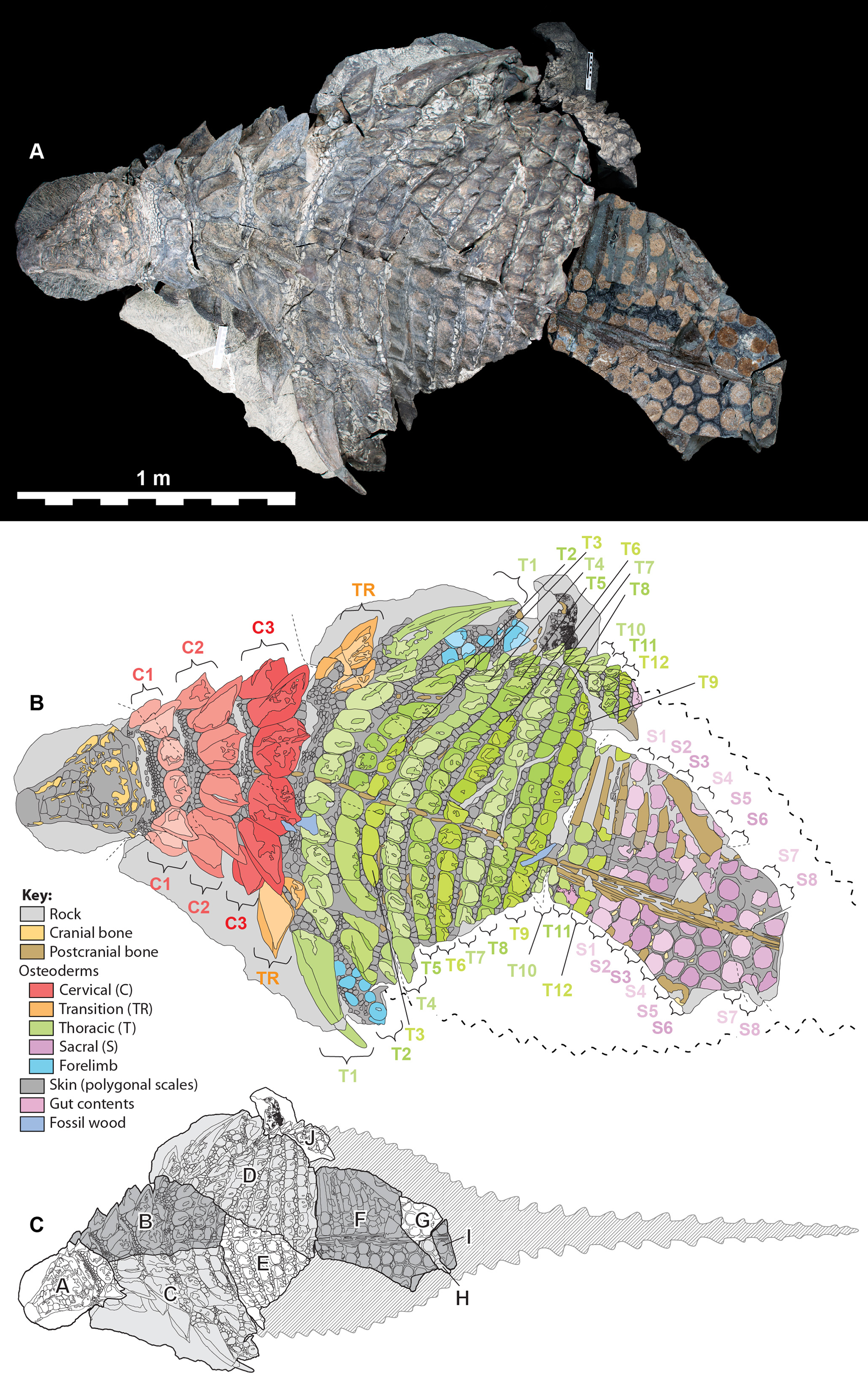
Photocomposite and schematic line drawings of the holotype

Borealopelta was classified by Brown et al. within Nodosauridae. In the phylogenetic analysis conducted by the authors, Borealopelta nested within nodosaurids more derived than Nodosaurus. The completed cladogram was a strict consensus in 480 different trees, each with slightly different results. In both strict consensus and majority rules cladograms Borealopelta nested with Pawpawsaurus and Europelta in a group of Albian nodosaurs, with Hungarosaurus being the next closest taxon. The phylogeny below displays the results of the strict consensus, excluding taxa outside Nodosauridae.

- Nodosauridae
  - - Sauroplites scutiger
    - Mymoorapelta maysi
    - Dongyangopelta yangyanensis
  - - Gastonia burgei
    - - Gargoyleosaurus parkpinorum
      - - Polacanthus foxii
        - - Peloroplites cedrimontanus
          - - Sauropelta edwardsi
            - - Nodosaurus textilis
              - - Tatankacephalus cooneyorum
                - - Silvisaurus condrayi
                  - - Animantarx ramaljonesi
                    - - Hungarosaurus tormai
                      - - Europelta carbonensis
                        - - Pawpawsaurus campbelli
                          - Borealopelta markmitchelli
                    - - - Struthiosaurus austriacus
                        - Stegopelta landerensis
                      - - Panoplosaurus mirus
                        - - Edmontonia rugosidens
                          - Edmontonia longiceps
                          - Denversaurus schlessmani

== Paleobiology ==
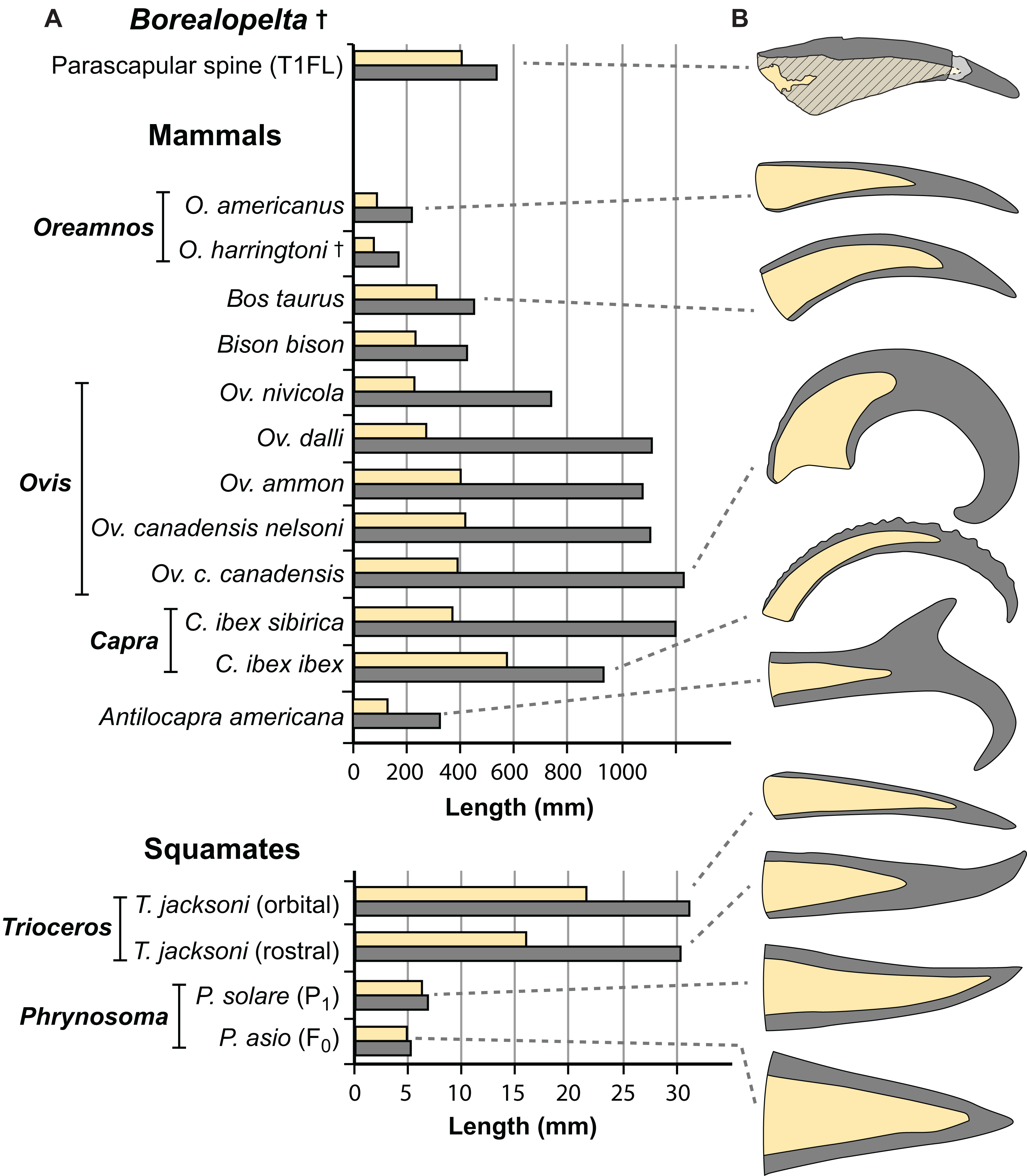
Comparisons of the size of the bony core and keratinous sheath of the parascapular spine of Borealopelta to modern analogs

The discovery that Borealopelta possessed camouflage coloration, indicates that it was under threat of predation, despite its large size, and that the armor on its back was primarily used for defensive rather than display purposes. Additionally, the spikes of Borealopelta might have had a dual function as defensive weapons and potential display structures useful in attracting mates and in species recognition. Borealopelta possessed a removable, flexible keratin layer up to 16 centimetres (6.3 inches) over its bony armor, allowing it to survive forces of over 125,000 joules per square meter. Paleontologist Michael Habib stated that the armor may have been used in combat to compete for mates, as it could withstand more force than predators of the time could apply.

=== Diet ===
Examination of the specimen's stomach contents indicates that ferns were a major part of the animal's diet. The fact that ferns made up the majority of Borealopelta's last meal suggested that it was a highly selective feeder. Roughly six percent of the stomach contents contained charcoal as well, leading to the conclusion that Borealopelta was feeding in an area that was experiencing regrowth after a recent wildfire. Brown and colleagues inferred that the ferns themselves had been halfway through their growing season when ingested, suggesting that the Borealopelta individual ingested them in early or mid-summer, dying only a few hours afterward. In 2023, Kalyniuk and colleagues compared the flora of the Gates Formation to the stomach contents of Borealopelta and suggested that type specimen fed on ferns selectively or in a fern-rich area that was recently disturbed.

== Paleoecology ==
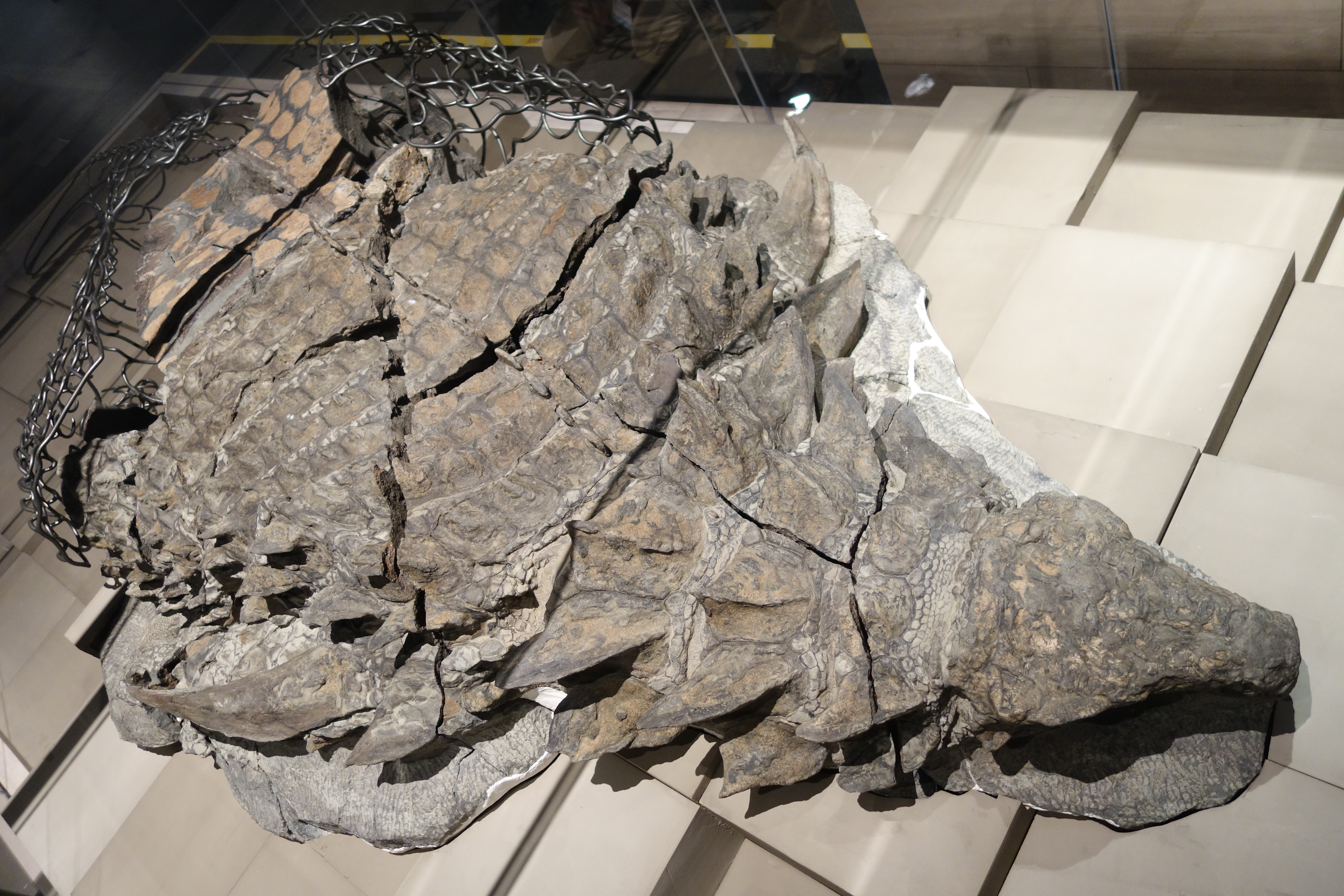
Specimen from the right side

The Suncor Borealopelta was preserved in the marine sandstones and shales of the Wabiskaw Member of the Clearwater Formation, which were laid down during the Albian stage of the Early Cretaceous period, about 110–112 million years ago. At that time, the region was covered by the Western Interior Seaway, an inland sea that stretched from the Arctic Ocean to the Gulf of Mexico, and the Wabiskaw sediments were being deposited in an offshore marine environment.

The holotype specimen of Borealopelta must have been washed out to sea, perhaps during a flood. Initially, it was thought that it had bloated after death and floated on its back at the surface of the water for weeks before the eventual release of the built-up gases within the trunk region of the carcass at which point it sank. Larramendi and colleagues in 2020 doubted this hypothesis, as ankylosaurians would need a density comparable to modern birds for this to occur which is most certainly not the case; instead, it is thought that the animal was washed out to sea where it drowned after struggling to stay near the surface and then proceeded to sink.

The fact that ankylosaurians are front-heavy is probably what led to the animal being fossilized upside down. It landed on the seabed on its back with enough force to deform the immediately underlying sediments. About 15 centimetres (5.9 in) of sediment settled over the carcass prior to the release of body fluids, as evidenced by fluid-escape structures preserved in the sediments, and the body cavity became filled with sand. A siderite concretion began to form around the carcass shortly after its arrival on the seabed, which prevented scavenging and preserved the body intact, with its scales and osteoderms in their original configuration.

== See also ==
- Dinosaur coloration
- Timeline of ankylosaur research
- 2017 in archosaur paleontology
