= Joli Fou Formation =

- Stratigraphic range: Middle Albian
- Type: Geological formation
- Unit of: Colorado Group
- Underlies: Viking Formation
- Overlies: Mannville Group
- Thickness: up to 61 metres (200 ft)

Lithology
- Primary: Shale
- Other: Sandstone

Location
- Coordinates: 56.044°N 112.585°W
- Region: Alberta, Saskatchewan
- Country: Canada

Type section
- Named for: Joli Fou Rapids
- Named by: Wickenden, 1949

The Joli Fou Formation is a stratigraphic unit of middle Albian age in the Western Canadian Sedimentary Basin. It takes the name from the Joli Fou Rapids on the Athabasca River, and was first described in an outcrop along the river, 8 kilometers (5.0 mi) downstream from Joli Fou Rapids, by RTD Wickenden in 1949.

== Lithology ==
The Joli Fou Formation is composed of shale with minor sandstone lenses. The shale is non-calcareous, dark grey, while the sandstone lenses are fine to minor medium grained, quartzose or micaceous. In central Saskatchewan, the unit contains glauconitic sandstone and mudstone interbeds.

== Distribution ==
The Joli Fou Formation is 33 meters (108 ft) thick at its type section, and reaches up to 61 meters (200 ft) in southern Saskatchewan. It occurs throughout the Western Canadian Sedimentary Basin, from the Rocky Mountain Foothills to south-central Saskatchewan.

== Relationship to other units ==
The Joli Fou Formation is the basal (oldest) formation of the Colorado Group. It is overlain by the Viking Formation (disconformably in south-eastern Saskatchewan) and conformably underlain by the upper Mannville Group (Grand Rapids Formation in north-eastern Alberta, Pelican Formation in southern Alberta).

It is equivalent to the lower Ashville Formation in southern Manitoba, the Skull Creek Shale in North Dakota and parts of the Blackleaf Formation in northern Montana.

In south-eastern Alberta, the base of the Formation contains the Cessford Sand marker, consisting of sandstone, siltstone and mudstone.

The Joli Fou Formation was previously referred to as the Pelican Shale, but renamed in 1949 to avoid confusion with the overlying Pelican Sandstone beds.
