= Gething Formation =

Stratigraphic Unit in Western Canada

- Stratigraphic range: Barremian-early Albian; ~125–110 Ma
- Type: Geological formation
- Unit of: Bullhead Group
- Underlies: Fort St. John Group, Bluesky Formation
- Overlies: Cadomin Formation
- Thickness: up to 550 metres (1,800 ft)

Lithology
- Primary: Sandstone, siltstone
- Other: Conglomerate, coal, shale

Location
- Coordinates: 56.00504°N 122.23972°W
- Approximate paleocoordinates: 57.7°N 70.0°W
- Region: Canadian Rockies foothills, western Alberta, northeastern British Columbia
- Country: Canada

Type section
- Named for: Gething Creek, Gething Mountain, Gething mine
- Named by: McLearn, F.H.
- Year defined: 1923
- Gething Formation (Canada) Gething Formation (British Columbia)

Gething Formation is a stratigraphic unit of Lower Cretaceous (Aptian) age in the Western Canada Sedimentary Basin. It is present in northeastern British Columbia and western Alberta, and includes economically important coal deposits.

The formation is named for Gething Creek, a right tributary of the Peace River west of Hudson's Hope, and the nearby Gething Mountain. It was first described by F.H. McLearn in 1923 in the Peace River Canyon, an area that was partly inundated in 1968 by the Williston Lake after the construction of the W. A. C. Bennett Dam.

== Lithology ==
The formation consists of alternating units of sandstone and carbonaceous shale or mudstone with some coal seams and conglomerate beds. The sandstones are fine- to coarse-grained, brown weathering, and typically platy to thin bedded, although some are massive. Mudstones are blocky to rubbly, with little lamination. Shale and carbonaceous shale units are fissile and are commonly associated with the coal seams. The sediments are mostly of non-marine origin, deposited in deltaic and coastal plain settings.

== Distribution ==
The Gething Formation is present in the foothills of the Northern Rocky Mountains and adjacent areas of the plains, extending from the Peace River region in northeastern British Columbia to the Smoky River area of western Alberta. In the Peace River Country, it reaches a thickness of 550 meters (1,800 ft), while in the Smoky River area it is 75 meters (246 ft) thick. North of the Peace River at Carbon Creek, it reaches 1,000 meters (3,300 ft).

== Relationship to other units ==
The Gething Formation is the uppermost unit of the Bullhead Group. It conformably overlies the Cadomin Formation and is disconformably overlain by the Bluesky Formation. It is correlated with the Gladstone Formation in the southern foothills, and is equivalent in age to the McMurray Formation that contains the Athabasca Oil Sands.

== Paleontology ==
Dinosaur footprints described from the formation include both carnivorous and herbivorous species.

Plant material is abundant, occurring as fossil leaves, stems, logs, stumps and rootlets. Ferns, cycads, Ginkgo and conifers are represented.

== Coal deposits ==
The Gething Formation contains coal seams that range from thin laminae to as much as 4.3 meters (14 ft) thick. Coal rank ranges from low- to high-volatile bituminous, and the coal has good coking properties except where oxidized. It has been mined by underground methods near the Peace River west of Hudson's Hope and near the Sukunka River.
