= Alberta Oil Sands Technology and Research Authority =

Alberta corporation

The Alberta Oil Sands Technology and Research Authority (AOSTRA) was an Alberta crown corporation to promote the development and use of new technology for oil sands and heavy crude oil production, and enhanced recovery of conventional crude oil. It was funded by the Alberta Heritage Savings Trust Fund. Its head office and information centre was located in Edmonton, with a second office in Calgary in Canada.

== History ==
AOSTRA was formed in 1974 for promotion of the development of new technologies for oil sands and heavy-oil production. In 1979 its mandate was expanded also to the conventional crude oil technologies. In 1984, AOSTRA initiated the Underground Test Facility as an in-situ SAGD bitumen recovery facility.

In 1986, the Alberta Department of Energy took over AOSTRA's role in developing oil sands technology, and on 1 August 2000, AOSTRA was reorganized into the newly established Alberta Energy Research Institute, and rebranded again to the name of Alberta Innovates—Energy and Environment Solutions with an expanded role to include other energy-related research areas such as wind, solar, fuel cells, clean coal and biomass.

== Operations ==
AOSTRA operated primarily through projects, the costs of which were shared with industries. The resultant technology is available to any user at fair market value. AOSTRA also supported research at Canadian universities and research institutions by providing grants to inventors, funding the operation of a technical information system, promoting international co-operation in oil sands development, and providing scholarships and fellowships for educational assistance. One of the main targets of AOSTRA finding of suitable technologies for that part of the Athabasca Oil Sands that could not be recovered using surface mining technologies.

== Technologies ==
Most notable technologies developed with assistance of AOSTRA include of Steam Assisted Gravity Drainage (SAGD), OSLO Cold Water Extraction (OCWE) and Alberta Taciuk Process (ATP).
