= Bluesky, Alberta =

Bluesky
- Hamlet
- Location of Bluesky Bluesky (Alberta)
- Coordinates: 56.0739°N 118.2383°W
- Country: Canada
- Province: Alberta
- Census division: No. 19
- Municipal district: M.D. of Fairview No. 136

Government
  - Type: Unincorporated
  - Governing body: Fairview MD Council

Area (2021)
  - Land: 0.37 km^{2} (0.14 sq mi)

Population (2021)
  - Total: 113
  - Density: 306.1/km^{2} (793/sq mi)
- Time zone: UTC−06:00 (Alberta Time)

Bluesky is a hamlet in Alberta, Canada within the Municipal District of Fairview No. 136. It is located along Highway 2, east of Fairview in northern Alberta.

Heavy oil was discovered in a well east of the hamlet in 1952, in a geological formation named after the community, Bluesky Formation.

== Demographics ==
Population history of Bluesky
Year	Pop.	±%
1951	20	—
1956	105	+425.0%
1961	108	+2.9%
1966	157	+45.4%
1971	124	−21.0%
1976	135	+8.9%
1981	139	+3.0%
1986	165	+18.7%
1991	192	+16.4%
1991A	193	+0.5%
1996	197	+2.1%
2001	189	−4.1%
2006	258	+36.5%
2011	164	−36.4%
2016	127	−22.6%
2021	113	−11.0%
Source: Statistics Canada

In the 2021 Census of Population conducted by Statistics Canada, Bluesky had a population of 113 living in 53 of its 62 total private dwellings, a change of −11% from its 2016 population of 127. With a land area of 0.37 km^{2} (0.14 sq mi), it had a population density of 305.4/km^{2} (791.0/sq mi) in 2021.

As a designated place in the 2016 Census of Population conducted by Statistics Canada, Bluesky had a population of 127 living in 60 of its 65 total private dwellings, a change of −22.6% from its 2011 population of 164. With a land area of 0.37 km^{2} (0.14 sq mi), it had a population density of 343.2/km^{2} (889.0/sq mi) in 2016.

== Events ==
- Bluesky Picnic Jam (formerly Bluefest)

== Notable residents ==
- Hubert Brooks, RCAF officer and Olympic gold medalist

== See also ==
- List of communities in Alberta
- List of designated places in Alberta
- List of hamlets in Alberta
