= Clearwater Formation =

Stratigraphic unit in Canada

- Stratigraphic range: Albian
- Type: Geological formation
- Unit of: Mannville Group
- Sub-units: Wabiskaw Member
- Underlies: Grand Rapids Formation
- Overlies: McMurray Formation
- Thickness: up to 85 metres (280 ft)

Lithology
- Primary: Shale
- Other: Sandstone, siltstone

Location
- Coordinates: 58.01365°N 111.34377°W
- Region: Northeastern and central Alberta
- Country: Canada

Type section
- Named for: Clearwater River
- Named by: R.G. McConnell, 1893

The Clearwater Formation is a stratigraphic unit of Early Cretaceous (Albian) age in the Western Canada Sedimentary Basin in northeastern Alberta, Canada. It was first defined by R.G. McConnell in 1893 and takes its name from the Clearwater River near Fort McMurray.

Impermeable marine shales in the Clearwater Formation provided part of the trapping mechanism for the underlying Athabasca oil sands in the McMurray Formation. Sandstone units in the Clearwater Formation, including the Wabiskaw Member, can contain oilsand and heavy oil resources.

Nearly complete specimens of plesiosaurs and ichthyosaurs, as well as one ankylosaur, have been recovered from the formation during oilsand mining.

== Lithology ==
The Clearwater Formation consists of primarily of black and green shale, with some interbedded grey and green sandstone and siltstone, and ironstone concretions. To the southeast of Cold Lake it includes massive hydrocarbon-bearing, glauconitic salt-and-pepper sandstones with interbedded shales.

=== Wabiskaw Member ===
The Wabiskaw Member forms the base of the Clearwater Formation. It consists of glauconitic sandstones with interbeds of black fissile shale, and it includes oilsand and heavy oil in some areas. It was defined in well Barnsdall West Wabiskaw No. 1 (located between Wabasca River and Lesser Slave Lake in central Alberta) by P.C. Badgley in 1952.

== Distribution ==
The Clearwater Formation is present in the subsurface of northeastern and central Alberta, and is exposed on lower course of the Athabasca River, as well as along the Christina River, a tributary of the Clearwater River southeast of Fort McMurray. It reaches a maximum thickness of 85 metres (280 ft) on the Athabasca River, thins out to 6 metres (20 ft) in the Cold Lake area, and wedges out towards the south. It is not present south of Edmonton.

== Relationship to other units ==
The Clearwater Formation is part of the Mannville Group. It is conformably overlain by the Grand Rapids Formation and conformably overlies the McMurray Formation. It is equivalent to the Bluesky Formation and the lower Spirit River Formation in the Peace River region, and may be equivalent to the Cummings Member in the Lloydminster region.

== Palaeontology ==
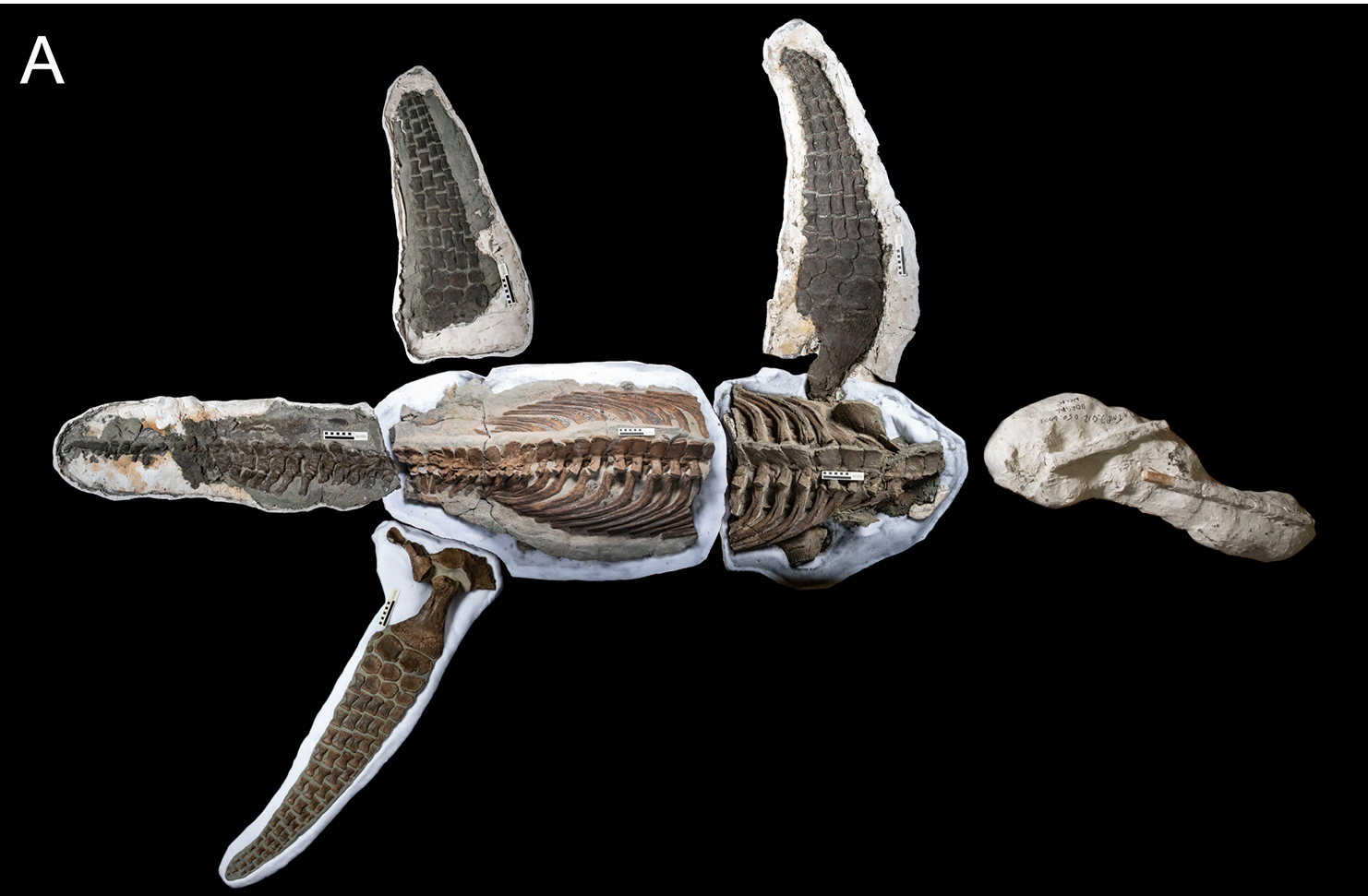
Wapuskanectes

The Clearwater Formation was deposited in marine, near-shore and estuarine environments on the eastern side of the Western Interior Seaway, and it contains marine and, rarely, terrestrial fossils. Workers at mines near Fort McMurray have made a number of significant finds while removing Clearwater strata to expose underlying oilsand deposits. Plesiosaurs such as Nichollssaura and ichthyosaurs such as Athabascasaurus, some of them nearly complete, have been recovered at Syncrude Canada Ltd.'s mines.

The well-preserved holotype specimen of the nodosaurid Borealopelta markmitchelli has also been recovered at the Suncor Millennium Mine. Plesiosaurs and ichthyosaurs were large marine reptiles, but the ankylosaur was an armoured dinosaur and represents a terrestrial animal that became entombed in the sea floor approximately 200 kilometres (120 mi) from the nearest known paleo-shoreline. Its bloated carcass probably washed out to sea and floated for several days before sinking to the sea floor.

All of the specimens now reside at the Royal Tyrrell Museum of Palaeontology.

== Oil/gas production ==
The formation contains oilsand in the Cold Lake and Primrose Lake region. Heavy oil is produced from the loose sandstones of the Wabiskaw Member by means of horizontal drilling in the Wabasca oil field, and the Wabiskaw contains surface-mineable oilsand in the Fort McMurray area.

The oilsands of the Clearwater Formation are more difficult to tap than those of the McMurray Formation. Cenovus Inc.'s Tucker thermal oilsands project which opened in 2006 began to post a modest return in 2013. Cenovus Inc. (CVE), with its head office in Calgary, Alberta, Canada is an integrated oil and natural gas producer.

== Extraction ==
=== Cyclic steam stimulation (CSS) ===
Canadian Natural Resources uses cyclic steam or "huff and puff" technology to develop bitumen resources. This technology requires one well bore and the production consists of the injection and production phases. First steam is injected for several weeks, mobilizing cold bitumen. Then the flow on the injection well is reversed, producing oil through the same injection well bore. The injection and production phases together comprise one cycle. "Steam is re-injected to begin a new cycle when oil production rates fall below a critical threshold due to the cooling of the reservoir."

=== High pressure cyclic steam stimulation (HPCSS) ===
"Roughly 35 per cent of all in situ production in the Alberta oil sands uses a technique called High Pressure Cyclic Steam Stimulation (HPCSS), which cycles between two phases: first, steam is injected into an underground oilsands deposit to soften the bitumen; then, the resulting hot mixture of bitumen and steam (called a "bitumen emulsion") is pumped up to the surface. The process is then repeated multiple times." An Alberta Energy Regulator (AER) news release explained the difference between high pressure cyclic steam stimulation (HPCSS) and steam assisted gravity drainage (SAGD). "HPCSS has been used in oil recovery in Alberta for more than 30 years. The method involves injecting high-pressure steam into a reservoir over a prolonged period of time. As heat softens the bitumen and water dilutes and separates the bitumen from the sand, the pressure creates cracks and openings through which the bitumen can flow back into the steam-injector wells. HPCSS differs from steam assisted gravity drainage (SAGD) operations where steam is injected at lower pressures without fracturing the reservoir and uses gravity drainage as the primary recovery mechanism." Canadian Natural Resources Limited's (CNRL) Primrose and Wolf Lake in situ oil sands project near Cold Lake, Alberta in the Clearwater Formation, operated by CNRL subsidiary Horizon Oil Sands, use high pressure cyclic steam stimulation.
