= Ellerslie School (disambiguation) =

Ellerslie School (founded 1877) is a school in Auckland, New Zealand.

Ellerslie School may also refer to:

- Ellerslie Girls' High School (founded 1898), Cape Town, South Africa
- Ellerslie (founded 1922), a girls' school in Great Malvern, Worcestershire, United Kingdom, now part of Malvern College

== See also ==
- Ellerslie (disambiguation)
