= Glauconitic Sandstone =

Galuconitic Sandstone may refer to:

- A subunit of the Mannville Group
- Glauconitic Sandstone more generally, a type of greensand
