= Ashville Formation =

Geological formation in Canada

- Stratigraphic range: Late Cretaceous
- Type: Geological formation

Lithology
- Primary: Sandstone

Location
- Region: North America
- Country: Canada

Type section
- Named for: Ashville, Manitoba

The Ashville Formation is a geological formation in Saskatchewan and Manitoba whose strata date back to the Late Cretaceous. Dinosaur remains are among the fossils that have been recovered from the formation.

It is geochronologically equivalent to the Lower Colorado Group and the Viking Formation in central Alberta.

== Vertebrate paleofauna ==
=== Hesperornithes ===
- Pasquiaornis hardiei - "Hindlimb elements."
- P. tankei - "Hindlimb elements and quadrate."

== See also ==
- List of dinosaur-bearing rock formations
