= Ellerslie Member =

- Stratigraphic range: Early Cretaceous
- Type: Member
- Unit of: Mannville Group
- Underlies: Ostracod Beds
- Overlies: Rundle Group
- Thickness: up to 70 metres (230 ft)

Lithology
- Primary: Sandstone
- Other: Shale, Siltstone

Location
- Coordinates: 53.396°N 113.5982°W
- Region: Alberta, Saskatchewan
- Country: Canada

Type section
- Named for: Ellerslie, Edmonton
- Named by: Hunt, 1950

The Ellerslie Member is a stratigraphic unit of Early Cretaceous age in the Western Canadian Sedimentary Basin.

It takes the name from Ellerslie, a community in southern Edmonton, and was first described in Imperial Oil's Whitemud No. 3 well by C. Warren Hunt in 1950.

== Lithology ==
The Ellerslie Member is composed of fine grained sand with sandy shale and shaley sand lenses in the upper part, and medium grained quartz sand, siltstone and coal in the lower part.

=== Hydrocarbon production ===
Oil is produced from the Ellerslie Member in southern Alberta and central Alberta.

== Distribution ==
The Ellerslie Member Lateral reaches a thickness of 40 m (130 ft) (Upper Ellerslie) and 30 m (100 ft) (Lower Ellerslie). It occurs in the sub-surface in central and southern Alberta and south-western Saskatchewan.

== Relationship to other units ==
The Ellerslie Member represents the lower part of the Mannville Group in southern and central Alberta. It is conformably overlain by the Ostracod Beds of the Manville Group and rests unconformably on Paleozoic strata such as the Banff Formation or Pekisko Formation, often separated by a Detrital Zone.

It is correlated to the McMurray Formation in the Athabasca Oil Sands of north-eastern Alberta and the Dina Member in east-central Alberta and west-central Saskatchewan.
