= Mannville Group =

Stratigraphic Group in Western Canada

- Stratigraphic range: Early Cretaceous
- Type: Geological group
- Sub-units: Glauconitic Sandstone, Ostracod Beds, Ellerslie Member, Grand Rapids Formation, Clearwater Formation, McMurray Formation, Waseca Sand, Sparky Sand, General Petroleum Sand, Rex Sand, Lloydminster Sand, Cummings Member, Dina Member, Pense Formation, Cantuar Formation, Success Formation
- Underlies: Colorado Group
- Overlies: Rundle Group, Banff Formation, Wabamun Formation
- Thickness: up to 145 metres (480 ft)

Lithology
- Primary: Sandstone
- Other: Shale

Location
- Coordinates: 53.3087°N 111.1541°W
- Region: Alberta, Saskatchewan
- Country: Canada

Type section
- Named for: Mannville, Alberta
- Named by: Nauss, 1945

The Mannville Group is a stratigraphic unit of Cretaceous age in the Western Canadian Sedimentary Basin.

It takes the name from the town of Mannville, Alberta, and was first described in the Northwest Mannville 1 well by A.W. Nauss in 1945.

== Lithology ==
The Mannville Group consists of interbedded continental sand and shale in the base, followed by a calcareous sandstone member, marine shale, glauconitic sandstone and salt and pepper sandstone. An additional non-marine sequence is present in north-eastern Alberta.

=== Hydrocarbon production ===
Bitumen is produced from the McMurray Formation at the Athabasca Oil Sands. Heavy Oil is produced from the Wabiskaw Member of the Clearwater Formation in the Wabasca oil field, and from multiple formations in the Lloydminster and Provost areas in eastern Alberta and western Saskatchewan. Natural gas is extracted from the Ostracod and Glauconite beds in southern Alberta, and light oil is extracted from the Ellerslie Member in central and southern Alberta. Multiple oil fields and gas fields tap into the Manville Group.

Total gas reserves amount to 316799×10^{6} m^{3} in the Lower Mannville and 644774×10^{6} m^{3} in the Upper Mannville. Recoverable oil reserves amount to 105.64×10^{6} m^{3} in the Lower Mannville and 199.20×10^{6} m^{3} in the Upper Mannville.

== Distribution ==
The Mannville Group reaches a thickness of 145 feet (40 m) in its type locality. It occurs in the sub-surface in central Alberta, extending east-west from Edmonton to Lloydminster and north-south from the Deep Basin to the United States border. It is present in the sub-surface in west-central and southern Saskatchewan.

== Relationship to other units ==
The Mannville Group is discomformably overlain by the Joli Fou Formation shale of the Colorado Group. It rests unconformably on the older Paleozoic carbonates.

It is correlated with the lower Blairmore Group in the Canadian Rockies foothills and to the Bullhead Group and the Spirit River Formation of the Fort St. John Group in north-western Alberta. It is also equivalent to the Cantuar Formation in Saskatchewan and the Swan River Formation in Manitoba.

=== Subunits ===
The Mannville Group includes the following sub-units:

==== Central and southern Alberta ====
Subdivision	Sub-unit	Age	Lithology	Max thickness	Reference
Upper	Upper Mannville	marine shale and sandstone			
Upper	Glauconitic Sandstone	Early Cretaceous	very fine to medium grained quartz sandstone with siderite and glauconite	35 m (110 ft)	
Lower Mannville
Lower Mannville	Ostracod Beds	Early Cretaceous	Unit A: shale and fossiliferous limestone Unit B: argillaceous limestone with ostracod fossils Unit C: dark shale with siltstone and sandstone interbed Unit D: fine to medium grained lithic calcareous sandstone with kaolinite and chert	40 m (130 ft)	
Lower Mannville	Ellerslie Member	Early Cretaceous	Upper: fine grained sand with sandy shale and shaley sand lenses Lower: medium grained quartz sand, siltstone, coal	40 m (130 ft); 30 m (100 ft)	
Lower Mannville	Detrital Beds	Early Cretaceous	Chert pebbles, lithic sandstone, shale, siltstone	70 m (230 ft)	

- In southern Alberta, the Ellerslie Member is replaced by the Sunburst Member, Taber Sandstone, and Cutbank Sandstone.

==== Athabasca region ====
Sub-unit	Age	Lithology	Max thickness	Reference
Grand Rapids Formation	Albian	bitumenous fine to medium sand (A, B and C sands, separated by silt and shale)	125 m (410 ft)	
Clearwater Formation	Albian	black and green shales and sand	85 m (280 ft)	
Wabiskaw Member	Albian	glauconitic sands with black fissile shale	35 m (110 ft)	
McMurray Formation	late Barremian to Aptian	fine grained bituminous sands	60 m (200 ft)	

==== Lloydminster region ====
Sub-unit	Age	Lithology	Max thickness	Reference
Colony Sand	Early Cretaceous	friable glauconitic and argillaceous sandstone	15 m (50 ft)	
McLaren Member	Early Cretaceous	very fine grained sandstone and shale	18 m (60 ft)	
Waseca Sand	Early Cretaceous	sand with silt and shale	25 m (80 ft)	
Sparky Sand	Early Cretaceous	sand and shale	12 m (40 ft)	
General Petroleum Sand	Early Cretaceous	very fine to fine grained quartzose sand	15 m (50 ft)	
Rex Sand	Early Cretaceous	very fine to fine grained quartzose sand with silt and shale	14 m (50 ft)	
Lloydminster Sand	Early Cretaceous	unconsolidated quartz sand with silt	30 m (100 ft)	
Cummings Member	Early Cretaceous	shale with beds of sandstone	27 m (90 ft)	
Dina Member	Early Cretaceous	quartz sandstone with siltstone and shale	60 m (200 ft)	

==== Southern Saskatchewan ====
Sub-unit	Age	Lithology	Max thickness	Reference
Pense Formation	Albian	fine grained sandstone, clay, shaly silt	36 m (120 ft)	
Cantuar Formation	Aptian to Albian	mudstone and sandstone	120 m (390 ft)	
Success Formation	Jurassic to Lower Cretaceous	quartzose sandstone and siltstone	75 m (250 ft)	
