= Viking Formation =

Stratigraphic unit in Canada

- Stratigraphic range: Late Albian
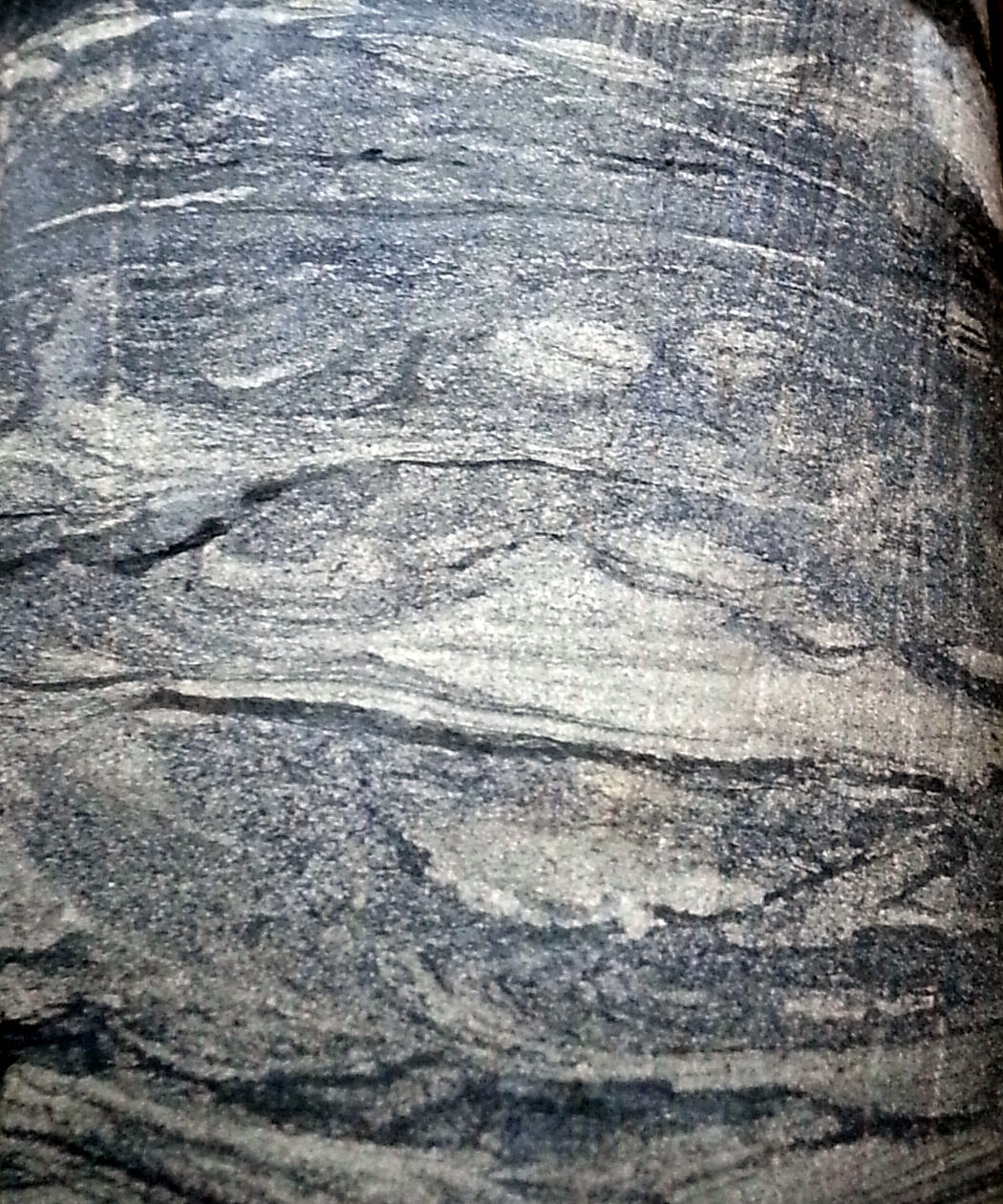
- Crossbedded Viking sandstone
- Type: Geological formation
- Underlies: Big River Formation
- Overlies: Joli Fou Formation
- Thickness: up to 50 metres (160 ft)

Lithology
- Primary: Sandstone
- Other: Conglomerate, chert

Location
- Coordinates: 53°N 111.5°W
- Region: Alberta, Saskatchewan
- Country: Canada

Type section
- Named for: Viking, Alberta
- Named by: Dowling et al., 1919

The Viking Formation is a stratigraphic unit of Cretaceous age in the Western Canadian Sedimentary Basin.

It takes the name from the town of Viking, Alberta, and was first described in the Viking-Kinsella oil field by Dowling in 1919.

== Lithology ==
The Viking Formation is composed of fine to coarse grained sandstone with interbeds of conglomerate and cherty conglomeratic sandstone. Nodular phosphorite, coal fragments and concretionary siderite occur in the coarse beds.

=== Hydrocarbon production ===
Oil is produced from the Viking Formation in eastern and central Alberta as well as in west-central Saskatchewan.

The Viking Formation had an initial established recoverable oil reserve of 88.7 million m³, with 66.8 million m³ already produced as of 2008. Gas reserves totaled 277.9 million e³m³ (or 227,900 million m³), with 103.4 million e³m³ (or 103,400 million m³already produced.

== Hydraulic fracturing in Canada ==
Massive hydraulic fracturing has been widely used in Alberta since the late 1970s. The method is currently used in development of the Cardium, Duvernay, Montney and Viking formations in Alberta, Bakken formation in Saskatchewan, Montney and Horn River formations in British Columbia.

== Distribution ==
The Viking Formation occurs in the sub-surface of central and eastern Alberta and in west-central Saskatchewan. It reaches a maximum thickness of 50 metres (160 ft) in central Alberta and thins out to 40 metres (130 ft) in Saskatchewan. Thinner sandstone beds can be recognized into western Alberta.

== Relationship to other units ==
The Viking Formation is conformably overlain by the Big River Formation and conformably and unconformably underlain by the Joli Fou Formation.

It is equivalent to the Bow Island Formation in southern Alberta, to the Newcastle Formation in North Dakota, to the Ashville Formation in Manitoba, the Pelican Sandstone in north-eastern Alberta and the Flotten Lake Sand in central Saskatchewan. It can be correlated with the Cadotte Member of the Peace River Formation in north-western Alberta.
