= Peace River Formation =

Geological formation in Canada

- Stratigraphic range: Middle Albian
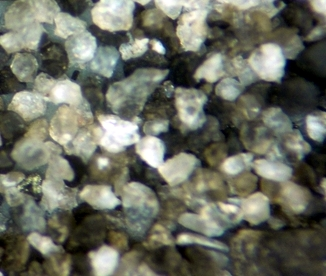
- Sand grains from the Cadotte Member sandstone
- Type: Geological formation
- Unit of: Fort St. John Group
- Sub-units: Paddy Member, Cadotte Member, Harmon Member
- Underlies: Shaftesbury Formation
- Overlies: Spirit River Formation
- Thickness: up to 60 feet (20 m)

Lithology
- Primary: Greywacke, sandstone, shale
- Other: coal

Location
- Coordinates: 56°12′N 117°20′W
- Region: Peace River Country
- Country: Canada

Type section
- Named for: Peace River
- Named by: McConnell, 1893.

The Peace River Formation is a stratigraphic unit of middle Albian age in the Western Canadian Sedimentary Basin.

It takes the name from the Peace River, and was first described on the banks of the river, downstream from the Smoky River confluence to the mouth of the Notikewin River by McConnell in 1893.

== Lithology ==
The Peace River Formation consists of greywacke, coal, coarse to fine marine sandstone and dark, fissile, non-calcareous shale.

=== Hydrocarbon production ===
Gas is produced from the Cadotte Member in northern-western Alberta.

== Distribution ==
The Peace River Formation is 60 feet (20 m) thick on average. The formation has different extents at different stages, with the Paddy Member present only in the Peace River Country in northern Alberta south of Clear Hills, while the Cadotte Member and the Harmon Member occur in both Alberta and north-eastern British Columbia.

=== Physiography ===
The Peace River Lowland, a landform region in the Alberta Plateau, is a gently rolling lowland without clearly defined outer boundaries extending east of the Rocky Mountains on both sides of the Peace River and sloping downward to the north and east. The higher hills in the foothills east of the Rockies in northeastern British Columbia have elevations of about 1000 m and the plains west of Lake Athabasca are about 300 m above sea level. The lowland's Quaternary sediments of the former lake bottom of Glacial Lake Peace are underlain by Upper and Lower Cretaceous sedimentary rocks mainly shales of the Shaftesbury formation and sandstones of the Dunvegan and Peace River formations. The Peace River and its immediate tributaries have incised almost 200 meters into the sediments and into the Cretaceous bedrock in the western section but only about 70 meters in the east side further north around Fort Vermilion.

On the basis of topography and landscape pattern, the area may be subdivided into four local physiographic units: the Peace River Lowland, Otter Lakes Upland, Utikuma Lake Upland, and Clear Hills Upland.

The Peace River Lowland is located in the central part of the area and is dissected by the Peace River. The Otter Lakes Upland in the northeast is a southern extension of the Buffalo Head Hills. It has a rugged moraine topography with steep slopes and isolated hills. Elevations above sea level range from 1,900 feet (580 m) to 2,600 feet (790 m). The Utikuma Lake Upland in the southeast also ranges from 1,900 feet (580 m) to 2,700 feet (820 m). The Clear Hills Upland in the west ranges from 1,900 feet (580 m) to 2,700 feet (820 m).

== Relationship to other units ==
The Peace River Formation is a sub-division of the Fort St. John Group. It is conformably overlain by the Shaftesbury Formation shale and is conformably underlain by the Spirit River Formation.

It is equivalent to the Commotion Formation in British Columbia and to the Scatter Formation in the Liard River area. It correlates to the Buckinghorse Formation in north-eastern British Columbia.

=== Subdivisions ===
The Peace River Formation is composed of the following subdivisions from base to top:

Sub-unit	Age	Lithology	Max. thickness	Reference
Paddy Member	Early Cretaceous	greywacke, coal	40 feet (10 m)	
Cadotte Member	middle Albian	coarse to fine marine sandstone	52 feet (20 m)	
Harmon Member	middle Albian	dark, fissile, non-calcareous shale	34 feet (10 m)	

The Harmon Member correlates with the Hulcross Shale of the Commotion Formation in British Columbia and the shale member of the Scatter Formation in the Liard River area. The Cadotte Member correlates with the lower part of the Boulder Creek Member of the Commotion Formation and to the sum of the sandy member of the Scatter Formation and the base of the Lepine Formation.

In eastern and central Alberta, the Harmon Member can be correlated to the Joli Fou Formation, and the Cadotte Members with the Viking Formation.
