= McMurray Formation =

Geological formation in Alberta, Canada

- Stratigraphic range: late Barremian to Aptian
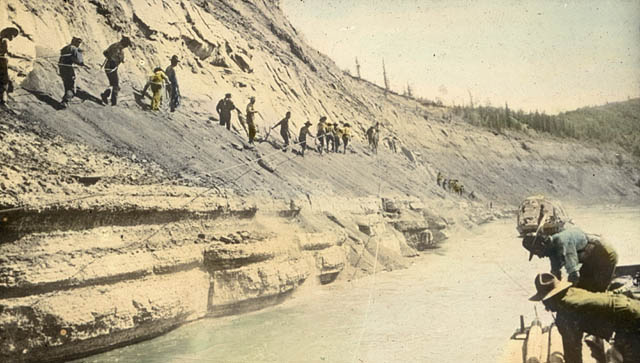
- Outcrop along the Athabasca River, ca. 1900
- Type: Geological formation
- Unit of: Mannville Group
- Sub-units: Upper, Middle and Lower members
- Underlies: Clearwater Formation (Wabiskaw Member)
- Overlies: Waterways Formation, Banff Formation, Wabamun Formation
- Area: 140,000 km^{2} (54,000 sq mi)
- Thickness: up to 60 metres (200 ft)

Lithology
- Primary: Sand, sandstone
- Other: Silt, mud, coal

Location
- Coordinates: 56.995921°N 111.456612°W
- Region: Alberta
- Country: Canada

Type section
- Named for: Fort McMurray
- Named by: F.H. McLearn,1917

The McMurray Formation is a stratigraphic unit of Early Cretaceous age (late Barremian to Aptian stage) of the Western Canada Sedimentary Basin in northeastern Alberta. It takes the name from Fort McMurray and was first described from outcrops along the banks of the Athabasca River 5 kilometres (3.1 mi) north of Fort McMurray by F.H. McLearn in 1917. It is a well-studied example of fluvial to estuarine sedimentation, and it is economically important because it hosts most of the vast bitumen resources of the Athabasca Oil Sands region.

== Lithology ==
The McMurray Formation consists of fine- to coarse-grained quartzitic sand and sandstone, interbedded with lesser amounts of silt, mud, clay and, less commonly, thin coal beds. The sands are very loose and friable, unless they are partially or fully cemented with bitumen or, less commonly, with calcite, iron oxides, or quartz.

== Stratigraphy ==
Three members have been defined within the McMurray Formation. They can be differentiated in outcrops and, to a lesser degree, in the subsurface:

- Lower Member: typically coarse-grained to conglomeratic sand, with minor beds of silt and mud; present only in depressions in the underlying Devonian formations; typically saturated with water, or poorly saturated with bitumen.
- Middle Member: typically massive, well sorted, fine-grained sand at the base, with inclined beds of thick, rippled sand and thin shaley silt partings in the upper portion; usually well-saturated with bitumen.
- Upper Member: typically horizontal beds of argillaceous, very fine-grained sand; usually saturated with bitumen.

=== Distribution ===
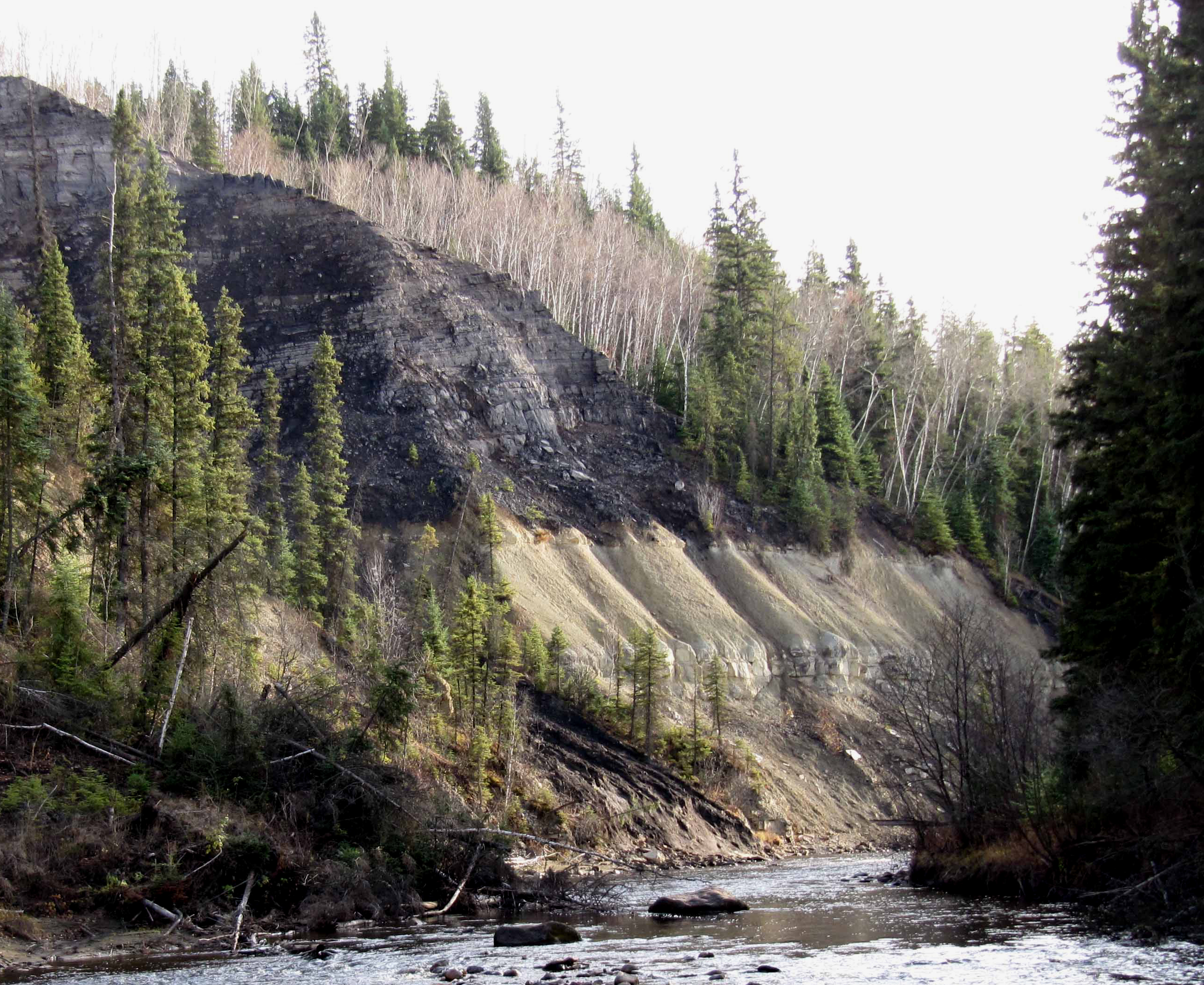
Outcrop of the McMurray Formation (black and dark grey) and underlying Waterways Formation (tan) on the Steepbank River

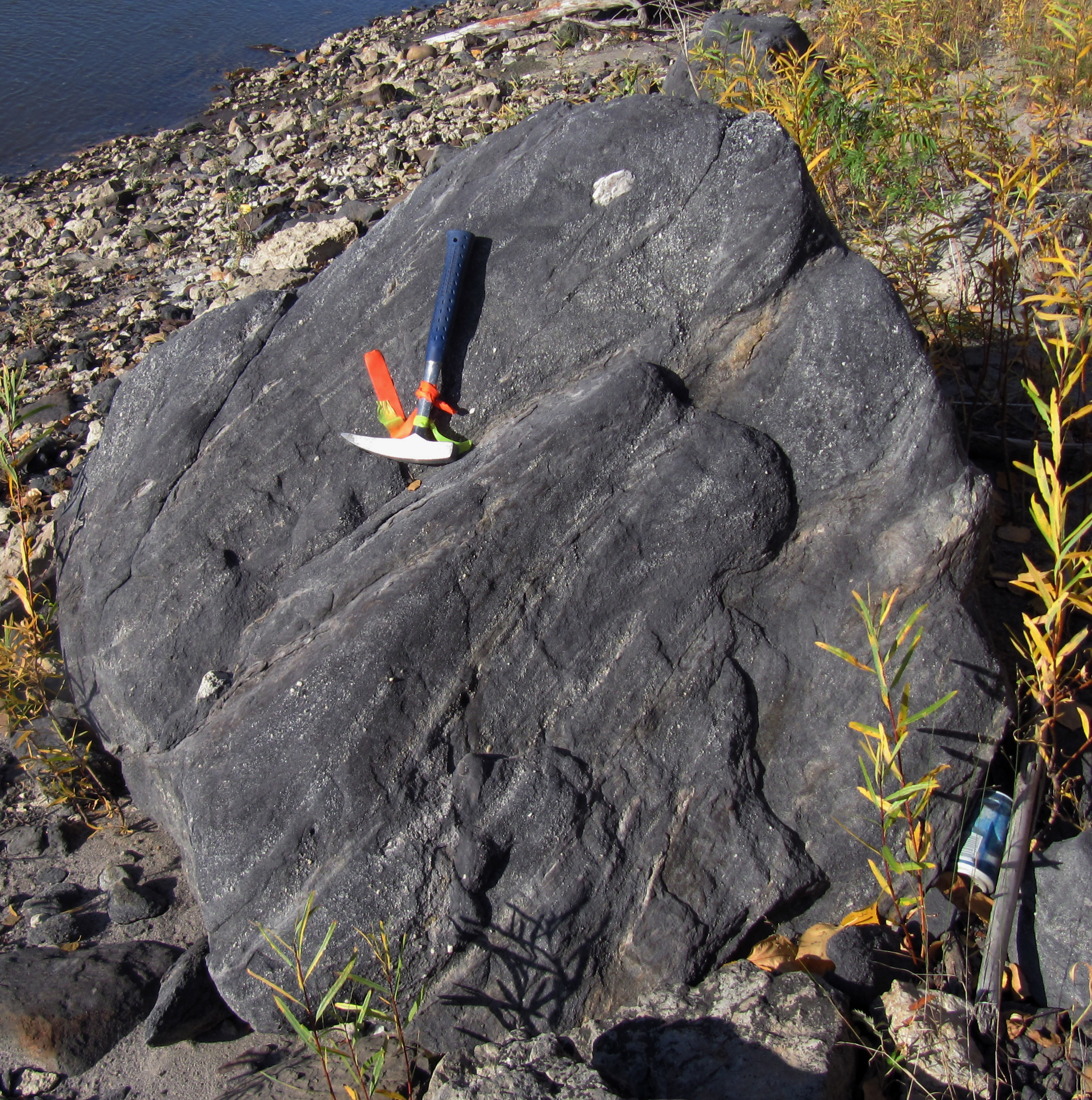
A boulder of McMurray Formation oil sand near the Athabasca River north of Fort McMurray

The McMurray Formation outcrops along the Athabasca and Clearwater Rivers and their tributaries near Fort McMurray in the Athabasca Oil Sands of northeastern Alberta, where it averages about 60 metres (200 ft) thick. It thins eastward into Saskatchewan where, in most areas, it is devoid of bitumen. It has been removed by erosion north of the Athabasca Oil Sands area.

=== Relationship to other units ===
The McMurray Formation is conformably overlain by the Wabiskaw Member of the Clearwater Formation. It is underlain by Devonian formations that were tilted and eroded prior to the deposition of the McMurray, resulting in a shallow angular unconformity between the McMurray and the underlying units. The McMurray therefore rests on different Devonian units in different parts of the basin. These range from the Elk Point Group in the east near the Saskatchewan border, to the Waterways Formation along the Athabasca River, and the Banff, Wabamun, and Winterburn Formations farther west.

The McMurray Formation is equivalent to the lower Mannville Group of Alberta, the Dina Formation of eastern Saskatchewan, the Gething Formation of northwestern Alberta and northeastern British Columbia, and the Ellerslie Formation and Ostracod Beds of central Alberta.

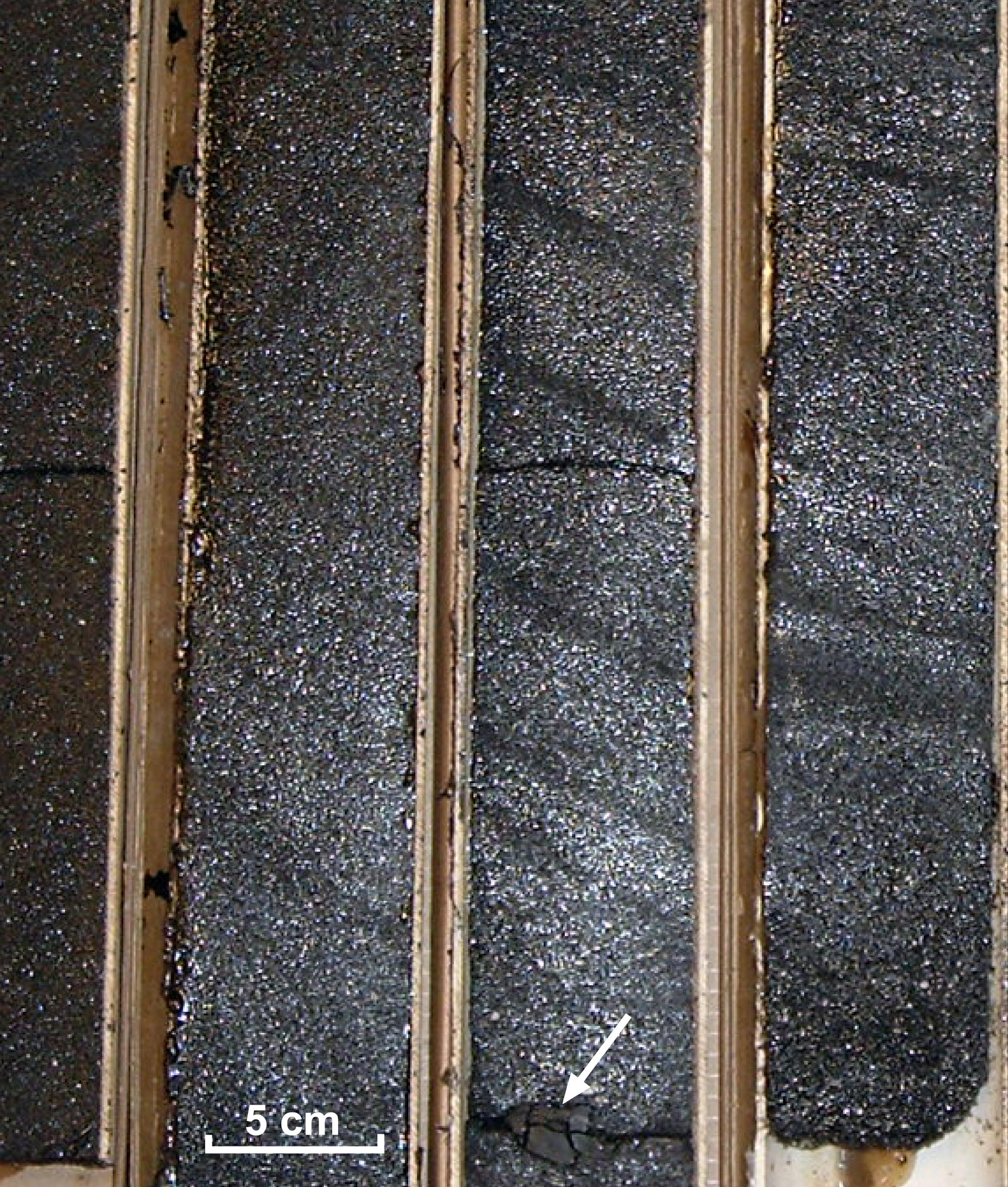
McMurray Formation oil sand as seen in drill cores. Arrow indicates a fragment of fossil wood.

== Depositional history ==
The McMurray Formation was deposited by an extensive drainage system that flowed northward following a regional north-south depression. The depression was created by the dissolution of thick salt deposits in the Devonian Elk Point Group deep within the subsurface. A rising sea encroached upon the drainage system from the north, and as this marine transgression progressed, depositional environments changed from fluvial at the base (Lower Member), to estuarine (Middle Member), to shore-face at the top (Upper Member), and finally to open marine in the overlying Clearwater Formation.

The channel sand deposits host the majority of the bitumen which is contained in the pore spaces between the sand grains. The largest sand channels occur in the Middle Member where, in places, they reach thicknesses of more than 30 metres (100 ft). They are flanked by off-channel deposits that consist primarily of mud and silt that accumulated in the floodplain, tidal flat, swamp, and brackish-bay environments that existed contemporaneously with the channels.

== Paleontology ==
Ichnofossils such as Skolithos and Teichichnus that were created by burrowing organisms are common in the middle to upper portions of the McMurray Formation. Other macroscopic fossils are rare, although fragments of coniferous wood and freshwater to brackish-water molluscs have also been described. Microscopic fossils include foraminifera, dinoflagellates, pollen and spores.

== Origin of the hydrocarbons ==
The original petroleum was probably generated from the organic shales of the Exshaw Formation, according to organic biomarker studies and isotopic ratios that act as a fingerprint for specific rock units. It then migrated up dip toward the northeast. Radiometric dating by the rhenium-osmium method indicates that it was emplaced in the McMurray and other formations at 112 ± 5.3 Ma (million years ago), not long after the deposition of the McMurray sediments. Biodegradation by bacteria then converted the oil to immobile bitumen. This may have contributed to the trapping mechanism for the hydrocarbons, as well as hampering the lithification of the host sediments.

== Hydrocarbon production ==
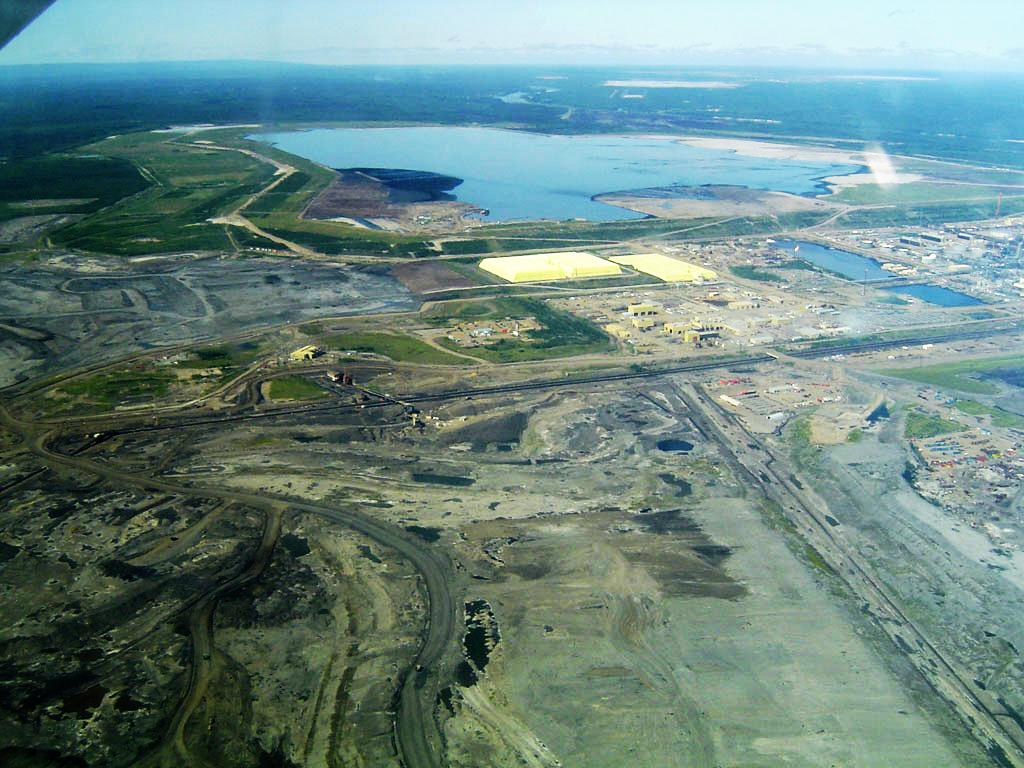
McMurray Formation mined in Syncrude's Mildred Lake mine site

Bitumen has been produced from the McMurray Formation in the Athabasca Oil Sands since 1967, at first by open-pit mining, and later from the subsurface as well, using in-situ techniques such as Steam-Assisted Gravity Drainage (SAGD). As of 2010, the output of oil sands production had reached more than 1.6 million barrels per day (250,000 m^{3}/d); 53% of this was produced by surface mining and 47% by in-situ methods. The Alberta government estimates that production could reach 3.5 Mbbl/d (560,000 m^{3}/d) by 2020 and possibly 5 Mbbl/d (790,000 m^{3}/d) by 2030.

== Hydrogeology ==
The Lower Member of the McMurray Formation consists predominantly of poorly consolidated, discontinuous sand bodies. These sands are commonly saturated with water rather than with bitumen, and they lie beneath the bitumen-saturated sands which are aquitards. They are commonly referred to as the Basal Water Sand (BWS) aquifers. Where these aquifers are deep-lying, they are recharged with saline water from the underlying Devonian formations, but where they lie at relatively shallow depths, recharge occurs from meteoric (surface) water and they are non-saline.

The BWS aquifers are commonly depressurized prior to open-pit mining because high pore water pressures can reduce pit-wall stability, and seepage onto the pit floor can reduce trafficability. They also have a negative impact on SAGD operations if they are in hydraulic communication with a steam chamber, resulting in heat loss.

There are also aquifers within the Upper McMurray Member and the overlying Wabiskaw Member of the Clearwater Formation. These can also interfere with SAGD operations if cool water from these aquifers invades the steam chambers.
