= Bullhead Group =

Stratigraphic Group in Western Canada

- Stratigraphic range: Barremian–Albian
- Type: Geological formation
- Sub-units: Gething Formation; Cadomin Formation
- Underlies: Fort St. John Group
- Overlies: Nikanassin Formation, Fernie Group, Minnes Group, Kootenay Group
- Thickness: up to 900 metres (2,950 ft)

Lithology
- Primary: Conglomerate, sandstone, siltstone and mudstone
- Other: Coal

Location
- Coordinates: 56.01°N 122.14°W
- Region: British Columbia, Alberta
- Country: Canada

Type section
- Named by: F.H. McLearn

Bullhead Group is a stratigraphic unit of Lower Cretaceous age in the Western Canada Sedimentary Basin of northeastern British Columbia and western Alberta. It was first defined by F.H. McLearn in 1918 as the Bullhead Mountain Formation, but later was upgraded to group status. It consists of the Cadomin and Gething Formations, although some early workers included the Bluesky Formation and others in the group.

== Lithology ==
Bullhead Group includes the conglomerate and quartzose sandstones of the Cadomin Formation at the base, and grades to sandstone, siltstone, mudstone, shale and coal seams of the overlying Gething Formation. Those sediments were deposited in alluvial fan, braided river, deltaic and coastal plain environments.

== Distribution ==
The Bullhead Group is present in the foothills of the Northern Rocky Mountains and the adjacent plains, extending from the Tuchodi River of British Columbia in the north to the Smoky River of Alberta in the south. It thins eastward from about 900 meters (3,000 ft) in the western foothills of northeastern British Columbia to about 100 meters (330 ft) in the Peace River plains, reaching zero near Fort St. John. The most complete section is found in the type locality of the Gething Formation in the Peace River Canyon immediately downstream from the W. A. C. Bennett Dam.

== Relationship to other units ==
The Bullhead Group overlies a major regional unconformity caused by pre-Bullhead erosion. It rests unconformably on the Fernie Formation, the Nikanassin Formation, the Minnes Group or the Kootenay Group, depending on the location and the extent of the erosion. It is overlain conformably by the glauconitic sandstones and marine shales at the base of the Fort St. John Group.
