= Cold water extraction =

Extracting a substance from a mixture

Cold water extraction (also called CWE) is the process whereby a substance is extracted from a mixture via cold water. It is a type of fractional crystallization.

The process generally involves taking a mixture of substances, dissolving them in warm water, and then rapidly cooling the mixture. The insoluble compounds precipitate out of the water, while the soluble ones stay dissolved. The solution can then be separated by filtration or decantation. This process works by exploiting the differences in solubility of different substances in a low temperature mixture.

Opiates are much more soluble in cold water than acetaminophen. It is used to separate out opiate drugs that have been mixed with common non-opiate analgesics. When cold water extraction is used with codeine/paracetamol, hydrocodone/paracetamol and oxycodone/paracetamol medications, it is not effective at removing all of the paracetamol.

== Items needed ==
The cold water extraction process is fairly simple not only due to the simplicity of the method but also because the items needed are minimal and can all be found in a common household. The items used in the process are usually 2 drinking glasses (or any other container), a screen (used to filter) and an item capable of crushing the tablets (mortar and pestle for example). The recommended screen to use is a simple coffee filter due to its high effectiveness when compared to other screens such as a piece of cloth or folded napkin.

== Legality ==
Extraction of controlled substances from over-the-counter or prescription drug formulations may be illegal in some countries.

== See also ==
- Codeine
- Hydrocodone
- Paracetamol
- Paracetamol toxicity
