= Horizon Oil Sands =

Oil sands mining project in Alberta, Canada

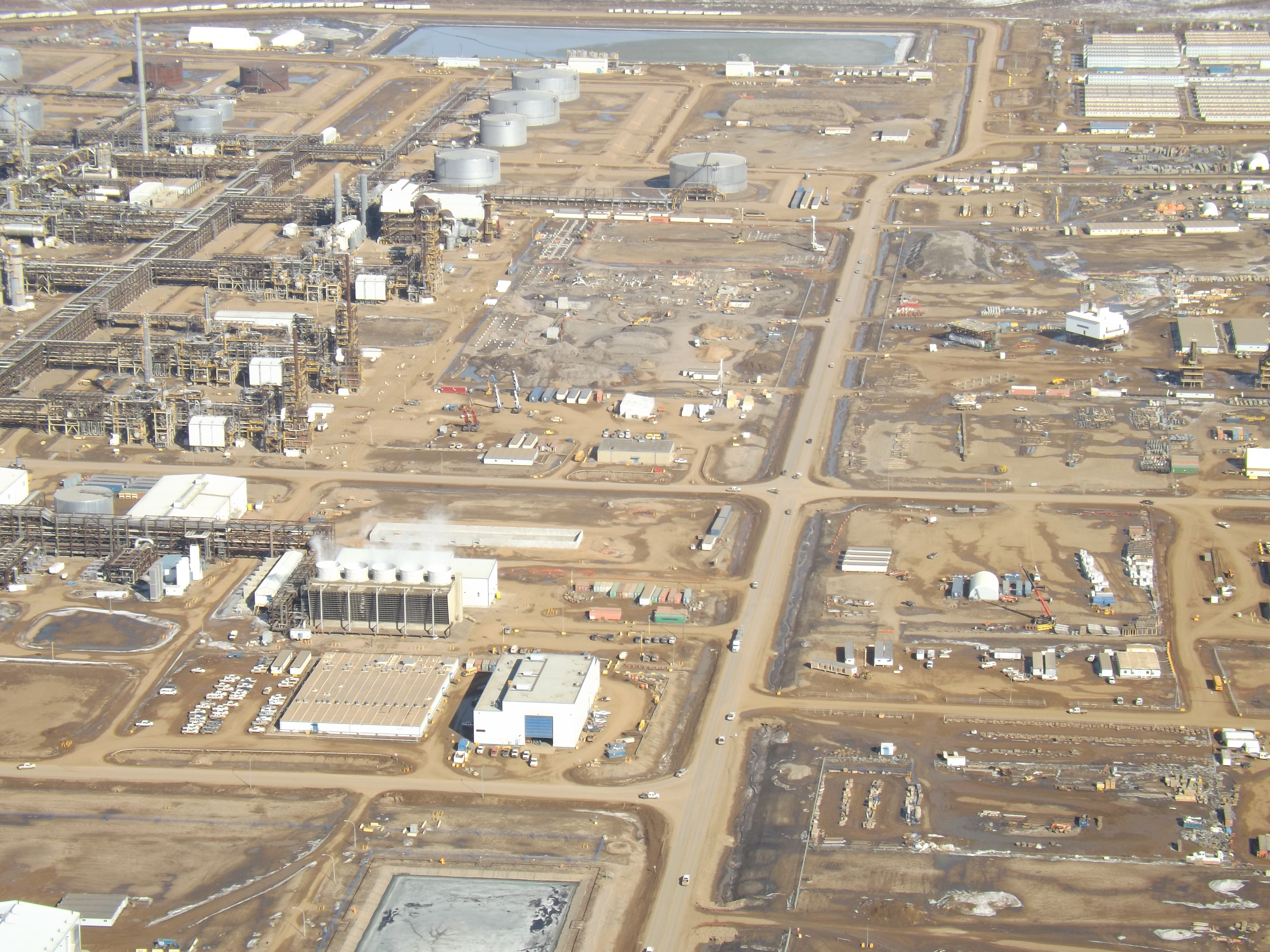
Aerial photograph of the Horizon Oil Sands in 2013

Horizon Oil Sands is an oil sands mining and upgrading project in Bitumount, Alberta, Canada. The project includes a surface oil sands mining and bitumen extraction plant, complemented by on-site bitumen upgrading with associated infrastructure.

Initial examination of the Horizon project began in 2004. Construction started in 2005 and it started operating on February 28, 2009.

Horizon is owned and operated by Canadian Natural Resources. The company holds leases that are estimated to contain approximately 14.4 billion barrels (2.29×10^{9} m^{3}) of bitumen initially in place (BIIP), with best estimate contingent resources other than reserves of 4.1 billion barrels (650×10^{6} m^{3}) of bitumen and 3.3 billion barrels (520×10^{6} m^{3}) of proven and probable reserves. The Horizon Oil Sands are located on these leases just north of Fort McMurray, Alberta in the Athabasca region.

== Controversy ==
On April 29, 2007, two employees were killed when a roof situated at the location collapsed. In addition, four other people were injured in the incident. On September 3, 2008, a contract employee was killed when their backhoe overturned in a tailings pond.
