= Fort St. John Group =

Stratigraphic Group in Western Canada

- Stratigraphic range: Lower Cretaceous
- Type: Geological formation
- Sub-units: Cruiser Formation, Goodrich Formation, Hasler Formation, Gates Formation, Moosebar Formation, Shaftesbury Formation, Peace River Formation, Spirit River Formation, Bluesky Formation, Sully Formation, Sikanni Formation, Lepine Formation, Scatter Formation, Garbutt Formation, Buckinghorse Formation
- Underlies: Dunvegan Formation
- Overlies: Bullhead Group
- Thickness: up to 2,000 metres (6,560 ft)

Lithology
- Primary: Shale
- Other: Sandstone, siltstone and conglomerates

Location
- Region: Northeast British Columbia; Northwest Alberta; Southern Yukon; Southern Northwest Territories
- Country: Canada

Type section
- Named for: Fort St. John
- Named by: George Mercer Dawson, 1881

The Fort St. John Group is a stratigraphic unit of Lower Cretaceous age in the Western Canada Sedimentary Basin. It takes the name from the city of Fort St. John, British Columbia and was first defined by George Mercer Dawson in 1881.

== Lithology ==
The Fort St. John Group is mostly composed of dark shale deposited in a marine environment. Bentonite is present in the shale, and it is interbedded with sandstone, siltstone and conglomerates.

== Distribution ==
The Fort St. John Group occurs in the subsurface in the Peace River Country of northeastern British Columbia and north-western Alberta, in southern Yukon and southern Northwest Territories. It has a thickness of 700 metres (2,300 ft) to 2,000 metres (6,560 ft).

== Relationship to other units ==
The Fort St. John Group is conformably overlain by the Dunvegan Formation and conformably underlain by the Bullhead Group or may rest disconformably on older units.

=== Subdivisions ===
The Fort St. John Group is subdivided into the following formations:

==== Canadian Rockies foothills of British Columbia ====
Sub-unit	Age	Lithology	Max. thickness	Reference
Cruiser Formation	Albian - Cenomanian	marine shale, argillaceous siltstone and fine grained marine sandstone	230 m (750 ft)	
Goodrich Formation	late Albian	fine-grained, laminated sandstone, mudstone partings	400 m (1,310 ft)	
Hasler Formation	middle to late Albian	marine shale and siltstone, minor sandstone and pebble conglomerate	265 m (870 ft)	
Commotion Formation	early to middle Albian	sandstone, shale and conglomerate	490 m (1,610 ft)	
Gates Formation	early Albian	massive well-sorted sandstone, carbonaceous sandstone, mudstone, siltstone, coal	263 m (860 ft)	
Moosebar Formation	early Albian	marine shale and siltstone	289 m (950 ft)	

==== Peace River Country ====
Sub-unit	Age	Lithology	Max. thickness	Reference
Shaftesbury Formation	Albian	friable shale, fish scale siltstone, bentonite, ironstone	400 m (1,310 ft)	
Peace River Formation	middle Albian	Paddy Member - greywacke, coal Cadotte Member - coarse to fine marine sandstone Harmon Member - dark, fissile, non-calcareous shale	60 m (200 ft)	
Spirit River Formation	middle Albian	Notikewin Member - fine to medium grained argillaceous sandstone, dark shale, ironstone Falher Member - greywacke, shale, siltstone, coal Wilrich Member - dark shale thin sandstone and siltstone stringers	348 m (1,140 ft)	
Bluesky Formation	early Albian	brown, fine to medium grained, glauconitic, porous sandstone	46 m (150 ft)	

==== Liard River and Fort Liard Area ====
Sub-unit	Age	Lithology	Max thickness	Reference
Sully Formation	early to Late Cretaceous	marine shale and siltstone	300 m (980 ft)	
Sikanni Formation	early Cretaceous	fine-grained, calcareous, glauconitic sandstone, argillaceous siltstone and shale	240 m (790 ft)	
Lepine Formation*	middle to late Albian	silty mudstone, sideritic concretions	900 m (2,950 ft)	
Scatter Formation*	early to middle Albian	Bulwell Member - glauconitic sandstone Wildhorn Member - silty mudstone Tussock Member - glauconitic sandstone, silty mudstone	375 m (1,230 ft)	
Garbutt Formation*	early Aptian	Lower Garbutt - mudstone, siltstone, siderite, bentonite Upper Garbutt - mudstone, sideritic weathering, argillaceous siltstone, laminated sandstone	290 m (950 ft)	
Chinkeh Formation	Barremian to early Albian	sandstone with marine shale, conglomeratic base	discontinuous	

* Buckinghorse Formation is equivalent to the sum of Lepine Formation, Scatter Formation and Garbutt Formation. It occurs north-east of the Canadian Rockies foothills in British Columbia, between the Halfway River and Muskwa River. It is composed of silty marine mudstone with fine grained marine sandstone interbeds.
