= Wapiti Group =

Stratigraphical unit in Canada

- Stratigraphic range: Cretaceous
- Type: Geological group
- Underlies: Scollard Formation
- Overlies: Smoky Group, Kotaneelee Formation

Lithology
- Primary: Sandstone
- Other: Conglomerate, coal

Location
- Coordinates: 55.1°N 118.3°W
- Region: Alberta, British Columbia
- Country: Canada

Type section
- Named for: Wapiti River
- Named by: G M Dawson, 1881

The Wapiti Group is a stratigraphic unit of Cretaceous age in the Western Canadian Sedimentary Basin. It has formation status in Alberta and group status in British Columbia.

It takes the name from the Wapiti River, and was first described along the banks of the lower Wapiti River and Smoky River in the Grande Prairie area by George Mercer Dawson in 1881.

== Lithology ==
The Wapiti Group is composed of thin-bedded to massive sandstone with occasional conglomerate and coal beds.

== Distribution ==
The Wapiti Formation occurs at surface as erosional remnants in north-eastern British Columbia along the Beaver River, Liard River, between the Kotaneelee River and Petitot River. It reaches a thickness of several hundred meters.

== Relationship to other units ==
The Wapiti Group forms the present day erosional surface in British Columbia, and is overlain by the Scollard Formation in its eastern reaches. It conformably and gradually overlays the Kotaneelee Formation in British Columbia, and the Smoky Group in north-western Alberta.
