= Kotaneelee Formation =

- Stratigraphic range: Late Cretaceous
- Type: Geological formation
- Underlies: Wapiti Group
- Overlies: Dunvegan Formation
- Thickness: up to 305 metres (1,000 ft)

Lithology
- Primary: Shale, sandstone
- Other: Conglomerate

Location
- Coordinates: 60.17°N 123.77°W
- Region: WCSB
- Country: Canada

Type section
- Named for: Kotaneelee River
- Named by: C.O. Hage, 1945

The Kotaneelee Formation is a stratigraphic unit of Late Cretaceous age in the Western Canadian Sedimentary Basin.

It takes the name from the Kotaneelee River, and was first described in outcrop in the river valley by C.O. Hage in 1945.

== Lithology ==
The Kotaneelee Formation is composed of marine shale, sandstone, conglomerate.

== Distribution ==
The Kotaneelee Formation has a thickness of 152 metres (500 ft) to 305 metres (1,000 ft) . It occurs in outcrop along the Petitot River and Liard River valleys from the Beaver River to the Kotaneelee River mouth.

== Relationship to other units ==
The Kotaneelee Formation is gradually overlain by the Wapiti Group and conformably overlays the Dunvegan Formation.

It is equivalent to the Wapiabi Formation in Alberta.
