= Ruopodosaurus =

Ruopodosaurus Temporal range: Late Cretaceous, Cenomanian

Trace fossil classification
- Ichnogenus: †Ruopodosaurus; Arbour et al., 2025

Type ichnospecies
- †Ruopodosaurus clava Arbour et al., 2025

Dinosaur footprint

Ruopodosaurus (lit. 'tumble down foot lizard') is an ichnogenus of ankylosaurian dinosaur footprint. The ichnogenus contains a single ichnospecies, Ruopodosaurus clava, described in 2025 from prints found in the Late Cretaceous (Cenomanian age) Dunvegan and Kaskapau formations of Canada (Alberta and British Columbia). Additional prints from the similarly aged Jindong Formation of South Korea were later tentatively referred to this ichnogenus. Ruopodosaurus represents the first recognized ankylosaurid tracks in the trace fossil record.

Ruopodosaurus is characterized by a pentadactyl manus (five-fingered hand) print and tridactyl pes (three-fingered foot) print. As such, it can be identified as having been created by a member of the ankylosaur family Ankylosauridae. This is in contrast to the tetradactyl (four-toed) pes prints of Tetrapodosaurus, which were created by non-ankylosaurid ankylosaurs such as 'nodosaurids'. Fragmentary body fossil remains likely belonging to ankylosaurids have also been identified from the Canadian geological formations from which Ruopodosaurus is known.

== See also ==
- List of dinosaur ichnogenera
- Tetrapodosaurus
