= La Biche Group =

Labiche Formation
- Stratigraphic range: late Albian to Santonian
- Type: Geological group
- Underlies: Belly River Formation
- Overlies: Pelican Formation
- Thickness: up to 420 metres (1,380 ft)

Lithology
- Primary: Shale

Location
- Coordinates: 55.01023°N 112.72600°W
- Region: WCSB
- Country: Canada

Type section
- Named for: La Biche River
- Named by: R.G. McConnell, 1892

The Labiche Formation is a stratigraphical unit of late Albian to Santonian age in the Western Canadian Sedimentary Basin.

It takes the name from La Biche River, a tributary of the Athabasca River, and was first described in outcrop in the Athabasca River valley by R.G. McConnell in 1892.

== Lithology ==
The Labiche Formation is composed shale with flakes of coccolithic debris, Inoceramus prisms, pyrite.

== Distribution ==
The Labiche Formation reaches a maximum thickness of 420 metres (1,380 ft) in the sub-surface of northern Alberta.

== Relationship to other units ==
The Labiche Formation is overlain by the Belly River Formation and conformably overlays the Pelican Formation.

It is equivalent to the parts of the Colorado Group in central Alberta and to the sum of Smoky Group, Dunvegan Formation and Shaftesbury Formation in north-western Alberta.
