= Cardium =

Cardium (from Greek καρδίᾱ kardiā, heart) may refer to:

- -cardium, a combining form used in terms associated with the heart such as pericardium, epicardium and endocardium
- Cardium (bivalve), a genus of molluscs in the family Cardiidae
  - Cardium edule, now named Cerastoderma edule, the common cockle
- Cardium Formation, a stratigraphic range in western Canada
- Cardium pottery, a Neolithic decorative style
