= Kaskapau Formation =

Stratigraphic unit in Canada

- Stratigraphic range: Turonian-Coniacian; ~90–86 Ma
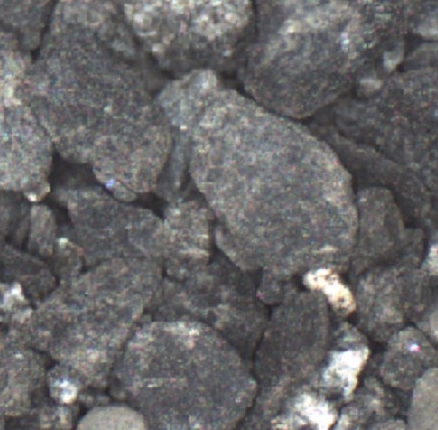
- Kaskapau Shale
- Type: Geological formation
- Unit of: Smoky River Group
- Sub-units: Doe Creek, Pouce Coupe, Wartenbe, Tuskoola
- Underlies: Bad Heart & Cardium Formations
- Overlies: Dunvegan Formation
- Thickness: up to 900 meters (3,000 ft)

Lithology
- Primary: Carbonaceous shale
- Other: Sandstone tongues and lenticles, volcanic ash

Location
- Coordinates: 55°55′N 118°38′W
- Region: Western Canadian Sedimentary Basin
- Country: Canada

Type section
- Named for: Kaskapau Ricer
- Named by: McLearn
- Year defined: 1926

The Kaskapau Formation is a geological formation in North America whose strata date back to the Late Cretaceous.

The name derives from kaskapahtew (ᑲᐢᑲᐸᐦᑌᐤ), the Cree word for "smoky". It was first described on the banks of the Smoky River, close to the confluence with the Puskwaskau River by F.H. McLearn in 1926.

== Geographical distribution ==
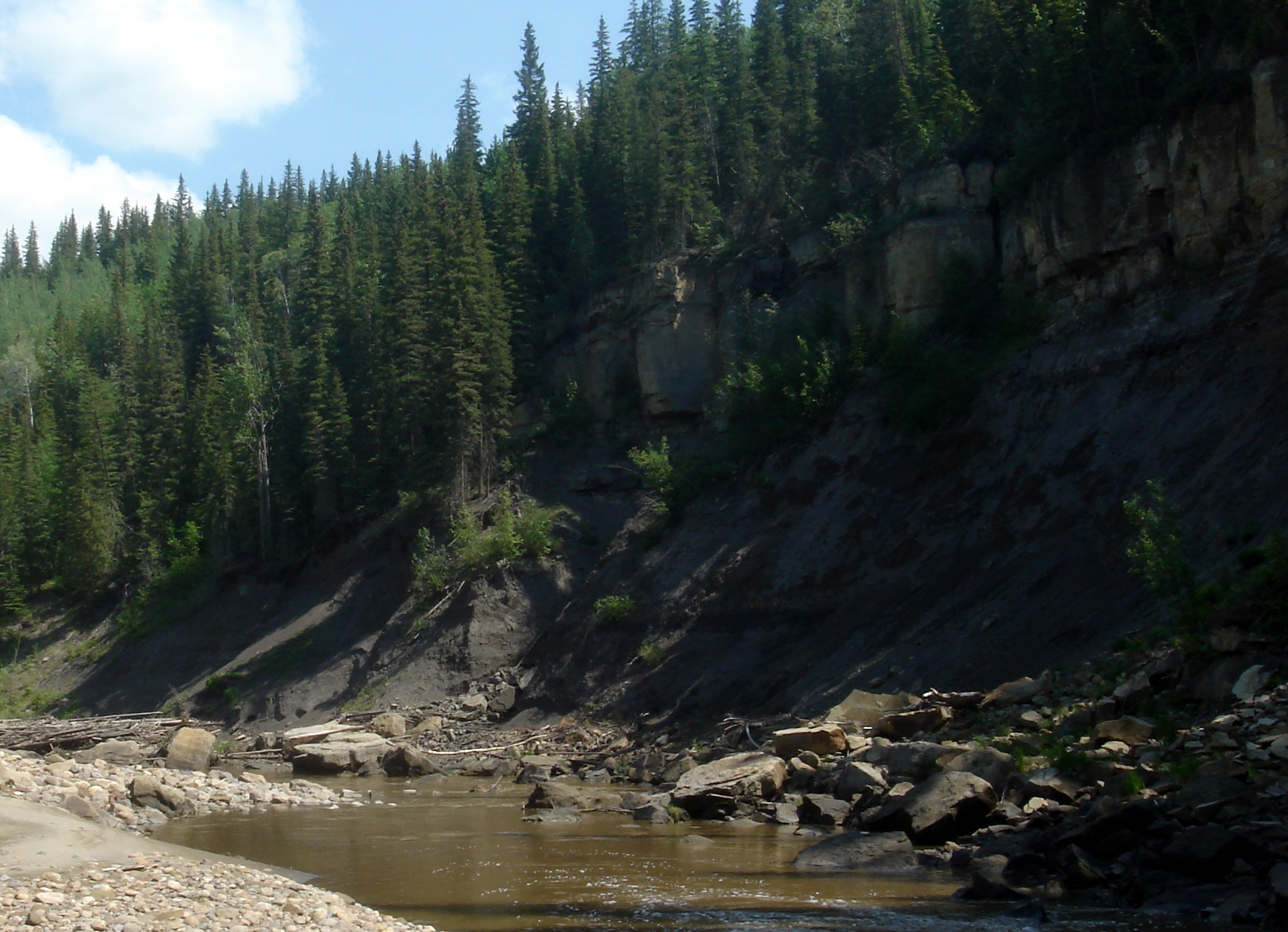
Kaskapau shale exposed along the Pouce Coupe River

The formation is 170 meters (560 ft) thick in the Peace River and Smoky River area, and thickens up to 900 meters (3,000 ft) in the foothills of the Northern Rocky Mountains in British Columbia. It is exposed along the Peace River near Dunvegan, as well as in the Smoky River area.

The formation is part of the Smoky River Group, and is conformably overlain by the Bad Heart Formation in the western area, and unconformably by the Cardium Formation in the Pouce Coupe River area. It is conformable underlain by the Dunvegan Formation.

The Kaskapau Formation is equivalent to the Colorado Group shale in central Alberta. It is equivalent to the upper Blackstone Formation, the Cardium Formation, and the Muskiki Formation in the Canadian Rockies foothills in western Alberta.

== Lithology ==
The Kaskapau Formation is represented mostly by dark grey shale, with sandstone tongues and lentils at the base (Doe Creek Member, Pouce Coupe Member). Thin volcanic ash layers may occur in the British Columbia foothills.

== Paleontology ==
Oyster fossils are encountered at the base of the formation, and Inoceramus fragments (such as I. labiatus) are found throughout the entire stack. Ammonites are also present in the sand beds, genus encountered include Dunveganoceras and Watinoceras in the lower part and Scaphites in the upper part. Microfauna include benthonic (and fewer planktonic) foraminifera. An indeterminate hadrosaurid and a possible nodosaurid are known from Quality Creek.
