= Favel Formation =

Geologic formation in Canada

- Stratigraphic range: Late Cenomanian-mid Turonian; ~95–90 Ma
- Type: Formation
- Sub-units: Assiniboine Member; Keld Member
- Underlies: Morden Formation
- Overlies: Belle Fourche Formation
- Thickness: Up to about 46 m (151 ft)

Lithology
- Primary: Calcareous shale
- Other: Argillaceous limestone, calcarenite, bentonite

Location
- Coordinates: 52°08′36″N 100°58′38″W
- Region: Saskatchewan; Manitoba
- Country: Canada

Type section
- Named for: Favel River, Manitoba
- Named by: R.T.D. Wickenden
- Year defined: 1945
- Favel Formation (Canada) Favel Formation (Manitoba)

The Favel Formation is a stratigraphic unit of Late Cretaceous (late Cenomanian to middle Turonian) age. It is present in southern Manitoba and southeastern Saskatchewan, and consists primarily of calcareous shale. It was named for the Favel River near Minitonas, Manitoba, by R.T.D. Wickenden in 1945.

The Favel Formation is richly fossiliferous and had yielded remains of a wide variety of marine animals, including the marine crocodile Terminonaris. It is also rich in organic carbon and is therefore an oil shale.

== Lithology and thickness ==
The Favel Formation is subdivided into the upper Assiniboine Member and the lower Keld Member. Both consist primarily of olive-black, chalk-speckled, calcareous and carbonaceous shale, with lesser amounts of shaly and argillaceous limestone, minor beds of calcarenite, and numerous thin beds of bentonite. The Assiniboine Member is topped by a bed of shaly argillaceous limestone called the Marco Calcarenite. The Keld is more calcareous than the Assiniboine, and is topped by a bed of shaly argillaceous limestone called the Laurier Limestone. The Marco and Laurier marker beds are notable for their strong "kicks" in well logs, and so are useful in identifying subsurface formations.

The Favel Formation reaches a maximum thickness of 46 m (151 ft) in southern Manitoba.

== Deposition and paleontology ==
The Favel Formation was deposited along the eastern edge of the Western Interior Seaway. The water was anoxic at depth, which was conducive to the preservation of fossils and organic matter.

Numerous fossils have been recovered from the Favel Formation. There are remains of coccoliths and planktonic foraminifera, aggregates of which make up the formation's distinctive the "chalk specks". Invertebrates include the bivalves Inoceramus, Mytilloides, and Ostrea, and ammonites such as Collignoniceras. There are bony fishes, including articulated specimens of Xiphactinus audax, as well as Apsopelix, Pachyrhizodus, and others. Cartilagenous fishes include sharks such as Odontaspis, Squalicorax, and Ptychodus, as well as rays. The largely complete skeleton of the marine crocodyliform Terminonaris robusta (first described as Teleorhinus robustus), was recovered from the Keld Member about 1 m (3 ft) below the Laurier Limestone bed, and has been nicknamed "Big Bert".

== Distribution and relationship to other units ==
The Favel Formation is present in the subsurface beneath the plains of southern Manitoba and southeastern Saskatchewan, and can be seen in outcrop in river valleys along the Manitoba Escarpment and the Pasquia Hills. Its contact with the noncalcareous shales of the Ashville Formation is conformable to unconformable, depending on the location, and the formation is unconformably overlain by the noncalcareous shales of the Morden Formation. To the west it is equivalent to the Second White Speckled Shale of the Colorado Group, and the Vimy Member of the Blackstone Formation.

In structure and fossil age, the Keld member correlates with the Greenhorn units widely identified in the Great Plains and within the Mancos Shale. The fossils (C. woollgari and I. labiatis) and well log indications of the top of the Greenhorn (Fencepost limestone) particularly correlate with the Laurier Limestone bed.

== Economic resources ==
The Favel Formation is an oil shale. It is rich in kerogen, with a total organic carbon content that ranges up to 10%. Fresh samples typically have a petroliferous odor. Because they were deposited under marine conditions, the Favel shales are classified as marinites, in contrast to the lamosite oil shales of the Green River Formation, which were deposited in a lacustrine environment. The formation may also have some potential for biogenic natural gas.

== See also ==
- List of fossiliferous stratigraphic units in Manitoba
