= Blackstone Formation =

Blackstone Formation may refer to:

- Blackstone Formation, Australia; a Late Triassic formation in Queensland, Australia
- Blackstone Formation, Canada; a Late Cretaceous formation in Alberta, Canada
