= Foremost Formation =

Geologic formation in Alberta, Canada

- Stratigraphic range: Campanian, 78.5–77.5 Ma
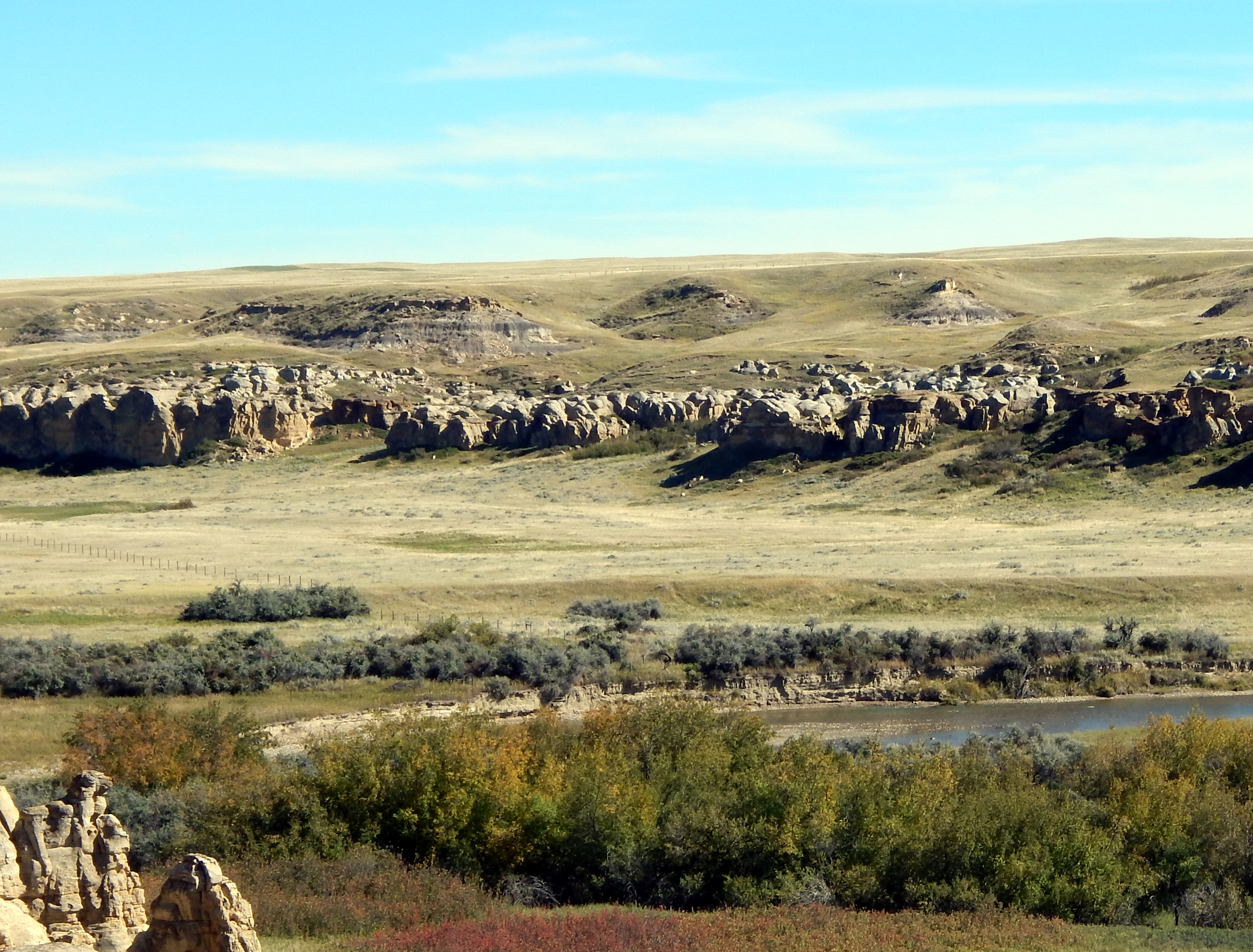
- Outcrops of the Foremost Formation (basal sandstone and MacKay coal zone) along the Milk River at Writing-On-Stone Provincial Park
- Type: Geological formation
- Unit of: Belly River Group (Judith River Group)
- Underlies: Oldman Formation
- Overlies: Pakowki Formation
- Thickness: up to 170 metres (560 ft)

Lithology
- Primary: Sandstone, siltstone, mudstone
- Other: Shale, coal

Location
- Region: Alberta
- Country: Canada

Type section
- Named for: Foremost, Alberta
- Named by: D.B. Dowling, 1915

The Foremost Formation is a stratigraphic unit of Late Cretaceous (Campanian) age that underlies much of southern Alberta, Canada. It was named for outcrops in Chin Coulee near the town of Foremost and is known primarily for its dinosaur remains and other fossils.

== Geology ==
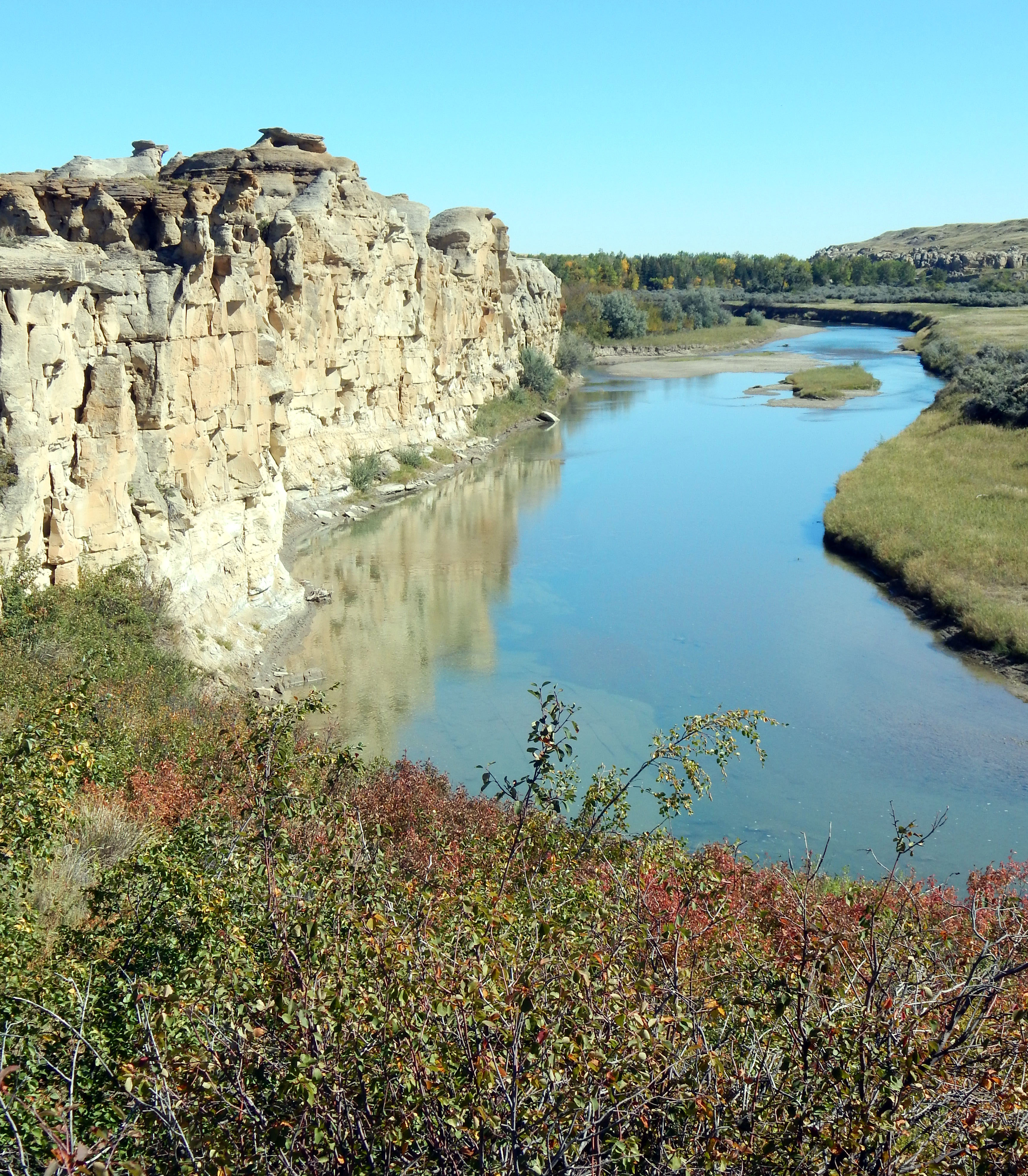
The basal sandstone of the Foremost Formation beside the Milk River at Writing-On-Stone Provincial Park

The Foremost Formation is the basal unit of the Belly River Group (called the Judith River Group in the United States). It gradationally overlies the marine shales of the Pakowki Formation. It consists of sediments that were eroded from the mountains to the west and carried northeastward by river systems, where they gradually prograded into the Western Interior Seaway.

The bottom of the formation typically consists of a basal sandstone unit overlain by the interbedded coal seams, carbonaceous shales and mudstones of the Mackay coal zone. The center portion consists of interbedded sandstones, siltstones and mudstones, with minor carbonaceous shales. At the top are the interbedded coal seams, carbonaceous shales and mudstones of the Taber coal zone. The basal sandstones, which are commonly referred to as the Basal Belly River Sand, are a significant hydrocarbon reservoir in some parts of Alberta.

The Foremost Formation outcrops along the Milk, Oldman and Bow Rivers. It is about 168 metres (550 ft) thick near Lethbridge, 107 metres (350 ft) thick near Medicine Hat, and 170 metres (560 ft) thick at Dinosaur Provincial Park.

== Paleobiota ==
=== Invertebrates ===
A variety of insects preserved in amber such as the ants Haidoterminus and Boltonimecia have been recovered from the Foremost Formation at a site near Grassy Lake, Alberta. The formation also includes a variety of freshwater, brackish water and marine molluscs such as Ostrea and Corbula.

=== Dinosaurs ===
The Foremost Formation has produced a lower diversity of documented dinosaurs than other Late Cretaceous units in the region unlike the Dinosaur Park Formation, Horseshoe Canyon Formation, and Scollard Formation. This is primarily due to their lower total fossil quantity and neglect from collectors who are hindered by the isolation and scarcity of well-exposed outcrops. The fossils are primarily isolated teeth recovered from vertebrate microfossil sites.

Color key: Taxon / Reclassified taxon / Taxon falsely reported as present / Dubious taxon or junior synonym / Ichnotaxon / Ootaxon / Morphotaxon	Notes; Uncertain or tentative taxa are in small text; ~~crossed out~~ taxa are discredited.

Dinosaurs reported from the Foremost Formation
Genus	Species	Location	Stratigraphic position	Material	Description	Images
Colepiocephale	C. lambei					Colepiocephale Dromaeosaurus Hesperornis Probrachylophosaurus Richardoestesia Saurornitholestes Stegoceras Thanatotheristes Xenoceratops
Dromaeosaurus	Indeterminate					Colepiocephale Dromaeosaurus Hesperornis Probrachylophosaurus Richardoestesia Saurornitholestes Stegoceras Thanatotheristes Xenoceratops
Hesperornis	H. regalis					Colepiocephale Dromaeosaurus Hesperornis Probrachylophosaurus Richardoestesia Saurornitholestes Stegoceras Thanatotheristes Xenoceratops
Paronychodon	Indeterminate					Colepiocephale Dromaeosaurus Hesperornis Probrachylophosaurus Richardoestesia Saurornitholestes Stegoceras Thanatotheristes Xenoceratops
Richardoestesia	Indeterminate					Colepiocephale Dromaeosaurus Hesperornis Probrachylophosaurus Richardoestesia Saurornitholestes Stegoceras Thanatotheristes Xenoceratops
Saurornitholestes	Indeterminate					Colepiocephale Dromaeosaurus Hesperornis Probrachylophosaurus Richardoestesia Saurornitholestes Stegoceras Thanatotheristes Xenoceratops
Stegoceras	Indeterminate					Colepiocephale Dromaeosaurus Hesperornis Probrachylophosaurus Richardoestesia Saurornitholestes Stegoceras Thanatotheristes Xenoceratops
Thanatotheristes	T. degrootorum			Right maxilla, right jugal, right postorbital, right surangular, right quadrate, right laterosphenoid, left frontal, and both dentaries	A tyrannosaurid closely related to Daspletosaurus	Colepiocephale Dromaeosaurus Hesperornis Probrachylophosaurus Richardoestesia Saurornitholestes Stegoceras Thanatotheristes Xenoceratops
Xenoceratops	X. foremostensis			Skull fragments		Colepiocephale Dromaeosaurus Hesperornis Probrachylophosaurus Richardoestesia Saurornitholestes Stegoceras Thanatotheristes Xenoceratops
Probrachylophosaurus	indeterminate					Colepiocephale Dromaeosaurus Hesperornis Probrachylophosaurus Richardoestesia Saurornitholestes Stegoceras Thanatotheristes Xenoceratops

== See also ==
- List of dinosaur-bearing rock formations
