= Colorado Group =

Geologic group in North America

- Stratigraphic range: middle Albian to Santonian
- Type: Group
- Sub-units: Colorado (type) and Kansas: Graneros, Greenhorn, Carlile, Niobrara; Canada: Phillips Sandstone, Second White Speckled Shale, Bowdoin Sandstone, Cardium Sandstone, Martin Sandy Zone, Medicine Hat Sandstone, First White Speckled Shale
- Underlies: Montana Group, Belly River Group, Lea Park Formation, Milk River Formation
- Overlies: Dakota Group, Blairmore Group, Mannville Group, Swan River Group
- Thickness: more than 1,000 metres (3,280 ft)

Lithology
- Primary: Shale, chalk, sandstone
- Other: Siltstone, conglomerate, limestone, bentonite, concretionary beds, massive septarians

Location
- Region: Alberta, Saskatchewan, Montana, Wyoming, Colorado
- Country: United States, Canada

Type section
- Named for: Colorado, specifically for the hogbacks and plains facing the Front Range of that state
- Named by: F.V. Hayden

Colorado is a geologic name applied to certain rocks of Cretaceous age in the North America, particularly in the western Great Plains. This name was originally applied to classify a group of specific marine formations of shale and chalk known for their importance in Eastern Colorado. The surface outcrop of this group produces distinctive landforms bordering the Great Plains and it is a significant feature of the subsurface of the Denver Basin and the Western Canadian Sedimentary Basin. These formations record important sequences of the Western Interior Seaway. As the geology of this seaway was studied, this name came to be used in states beyond Colorado but later was replaced in several of these states with more localized names.

The USGS convention has been to use Colorado Group where the rocks are further divided into formations, Colorado Formation where no beds are developed enough to be mapped as formations, and Colorado Shale where the unit is composed of little more than shale with no distinctive structures (such as in north-central Montana).

== History of exploration ==
- In 1862, F.B. Meek and F.V. Hayden described their “Upper Missouri River” series; Dakota, Benton, Pierre, Niobrara, and Fox Hills.
- In 1871, Hayden crossed Kansas and Colorado on the recently completed Kansas Pacific Railway, and between Abilene and Limon confirmed the whole series within the two states.
- Hayden proposed term "Colorado Group" in 1876 to embrace the Benton, Niobrara, and Pierre units for their collective exposures in the dramatic hogbacks and incised plateaus facing the Rocky Mountain front ranges of Colorado. The group was described by A. Hague and S.E. Emmons in 1877.
- However, by 1878, C. A. White restricted the Colorado Group to the Benton and Niobrara, which are the formations found within the flatirons and secondary hogbacks on the east flank of the Dakota Hogback.
- During the last decade of the 19th Century, Cretaceous rocks in Colorado and western Kansas were a focus of considerable study. The Benton and Niobrara were particularly associated in the Smoky Hills of Kansas, the Arkansas River valley across southeastern Colorado, and the Colorado Front Range. G. K. Gilbert observed that of Meek and Hayden's five Cretaceous units, only the Benton and Niobrara (incidentally the Colorado Group) were chalky; moreover, the chalkiness was expressed as curiously rhythmic bedding. A well-known glaciologist, Gilbert correctly theorized that the reason for these peculiar rhythmites was periodic astronomical solar forcing, and that these rhythms were absent in the Pierre only because there was no source of carbonate in the Pierre environment. His theory was confirmed with later recognitions that Milankovitch cycles can be expressed in conditions of total global absence of glaciers. Gilbert subsequently replaced the Benton with five formations based on the changes he observed in the chalkiness; non-chalky Graneros, chalky Greenhorn, non-chalky Carlile, massively chalky Timpas (later abandoned in favor of Fort Hays), and chalky Apishapa (later abandoned in favor of Smoky Hill).
- The Colorado Classification was initially adopted throughout the extent of the Western Interior Seaway, including Canada. However, in the 21st Century, some states, such as Wyoming and Montana, are abandoning the term. Donald E. Hattin advised that the Colorado Group should not be used in Kansas because he considered its units to be "too lithologically diverse"; yet, Colorado Group remains listed in the geologic succession in Kansas.

Summary of Colorado Group classifications
Meek & Hayden 1862	Hayden 1871	White 1878	Colorado Kansas (current)	Canada (current)
Fox Hills			Montana	Belly River
Pierre	Colorado	Pierre	Montana	Colorado
Niobrara	Colorado	Colorado	Colorado	Colorado
Benton	Colorado	Colorado	Colorado	Colorado
Dakota

== Lithology ==
The Colorado Group consists primarily of chalky and non-chalky shale, and incorporates conglomerate, sandstone and siltstone, rhythmite beds of chalk, chalky limestone, coquinas, phosphorite, recurring beds of bentonite, massive septatians, and concretionary beds including calcite, siderite, and pyrite.

The Canadian distribution presents with more sandstone. The lower part includes the following sandstone members: Phillips Sandstone (below the Second White Speckled Shale), Bowdoin Sandstone and Cardium Sandstone in the non-calcareous shale unit. The upper part includes the Martin Sandy Zone and Medicine Hat Sandstone.

=== Oil/gas production ===
Gas is produced from the sandstone members in southern Alberta, southern Saskatchewan and in Montana, such as in the Bowdoin gas field.

== Distribution ==
Shales of middle Albian to Santonian age are distributed throughout much of the former extent of the Western Interior Seaway, including broadly from Arizona, to Iowa and Alberta. The Greenhorn-Carlile contact represents the maximum extent of the seaway of that sequence, perhaps of the entire time of the seaway; and, so, coupled with the Graneros Shale, the "old Benton" shales are the widest durable remnant of the Western Interior Seaway. Older literature may use the term Colorado Group in this extent, but several states outside of Colorado no longer use the term in current publications; nevertheless, the evidence of correlated seaway sequences and fossil patterns remains, regardless of current names.

From Iowa to Arizona, the lithology is remarkably consistent and the bentonites and rhythmic chalk beds of the upper Greenhorn especially are geologic events that can be traced over that distance. Beyond the historic western extent of the Colorado Group usage into the Mancos Shale, the chalky beds of the group can be identified and are named accordingly, e.g., Smoky Hill, Fort Hays, Bridge Creek, Greenhorn. However, northwest of the Transcontinental Arch where western sediment sources are more dominant, altering the lithology, these names have less current use.

The Canadian Colorado Group occurs in the sub-surface throughout southern and central Alberta, western and central Saskatchewan. It is found in outcrops along the south-western edge of the Canadian Shield. The sediments of the Colorado group exceed 1,000 metres (3,280 ft) in thickness in central Alberta. In central Saskatchewan, it thins to 150 metres (490 ft).

== Relationship to other units ==
The rocks of Colorado Group age are overlain by the Montana Group and underlain by the Dakota Group in the Denver Basin, Powder River Basin, and Williston Basin of the western Great Plains. In Western Canada, they are unconformably overlain by the Lea Park Formation shale and unconformably underlain by the Blairmore, Mannville or Swan River Group.

The lower part is equivalent with the Ashville Formation in eastern Saskatchewan and southern Manitoba, with the upper part corresponding to the Vermillion River Formation and Favel Formation. It is equivalent to the sum of Crowsnest Formation, Blackstone Formation, Cardium Formation, and the lower Wapiabi Formation of the Alberta Group in the Canadian Rockies foothills. It correlates with the upper Smoky Group, Dunvegan Formation, Shaftesbury Formation, Paddy Member and Labiche Formation in northern Alberta. The Canadian Colorado Group was previously named Lloydminster Shale in the Lloydminster region, but the term is now obsolete.

== Sub-units ==
United States sub-unit classifications have generally derived from the related Colorado and Kansas classifications, from top to bottom:

Colorado and Kansas classification of regional Colorado Group sub-units
Formation	Member	Age	Lithology
Niobrara (calcareous)	Smoky Hill Chalk	Early-Campanian- Late-Coniacian	repeating beds of buff chalk and chalky shale
Niobrara (calcareous)	Fort Hays Limestone	Coniacian	massive chalky limestone
Carlile (carbonaceous)	Juana Lopez Sandstone	Early-Coniacian	beds of calcarenite separated by intervals of mudstone
Carlile (carbonaceous)	Codell Sandstone	Late-Turonian	very fine-grained sandstone and siltstone, shale
Carlile (carbonaceous)	Blue Hill Shale	Turonian	olive-black, carbonaceous shale; repeating thin bentonites; septarians
Carlile (carbonaceous)	Fairport Shale	Turonian	olive-black, carbonaceous shale to chalky shale with repeating thin chalks; repeating thin bentonites
Greenhorn (calcareous)	Bridge Creek/ Pfeifer Shale	Turonian	bench-forming fencepost limestone marker bed olive-black, chalky shale with repeating, thin chalky limestone beds; repeating thin bentonites
Greenhorn (calcareous)	Bridge Creek/ Jetmore Chalk	Turonian	bench-forming Shellrock marker bed chalky shale with very rhythmic, thin limestone beds
Greenhorn (calcareous)	Hartland Shale	Late-Cenomanian	chalky shale almost devoid of limestone
Greenhorn (calcareous)	Lincoln Limestone	Late-Cenomanian	shaly chalk with many scattered, thin skeletal limestone beds; repeating thin bentonites X-bentonite marker bed (Colorado)
Graneros (carbonaceous)	(Thatcher Limestone)	Mid-Cenomanian	X-bentonite marker bed (Kansas) finely sandy, clayey, gray near-shore/marginal-marine shale; septarians

The Colorado Group in Canada, which retains the Santonian-time Pierre Shale correlations, is divided into an upper part which is calcareous, and a lower part, which is non-calcareous. The sub-units are defined at the base of two regional markers, called First and Second White Speckled Shale characterized by coccolithic debris.

The Canadian Geological Survey classification of the Colorado Group includes the following sub-units, from top to bottom:

Canadian classification of regional Colorado Group subunits
Subdivision	Sub-unit	Age	Lithology	Max. thickness	Reference
Upper (calcareous)	First White Speckled Shale	Santonian	olive-black, chalk-speckled, calcareous and carbonaceous shale; minor shaly limestone	157 m (520 ft)	
Upper (calcareous)	Medicine Hat Sandstone	Santonian	muddy sandstone and siltstone	14 m (50 ft)	
Upper (calcareous)	Martin Sandy Zone	Santonian	Siltstone, fine grained sandstone and calcareous shale	60 m (200 ft)	
Lower (non-calcareous)	Cardium Sandstone	Turonian to Coniacian	marine sandstone	108 m (350 ft)	
Lower (non-calcareous)	Bowdoin Sandstone	Turonian	very fine-grained sandstone and siltstone, shale	61 m (200 ft)	
Lower (non-calcareous)	Second White Speckled Shale	Turonian	olive-black, chalk-speckled, calcareous and carbonaceous shale; minor shaly limestone	70 m (230 ft)	
Lower (non-calcareous)	Phillips Sandstone	Turonian	very fine grained sandstone and siltstone, dark calcareous shale	38 m (120 ft)	
