= Smoky Group =

Geologic formation in Canada

- Stratigraphic range: Late Cretaceous
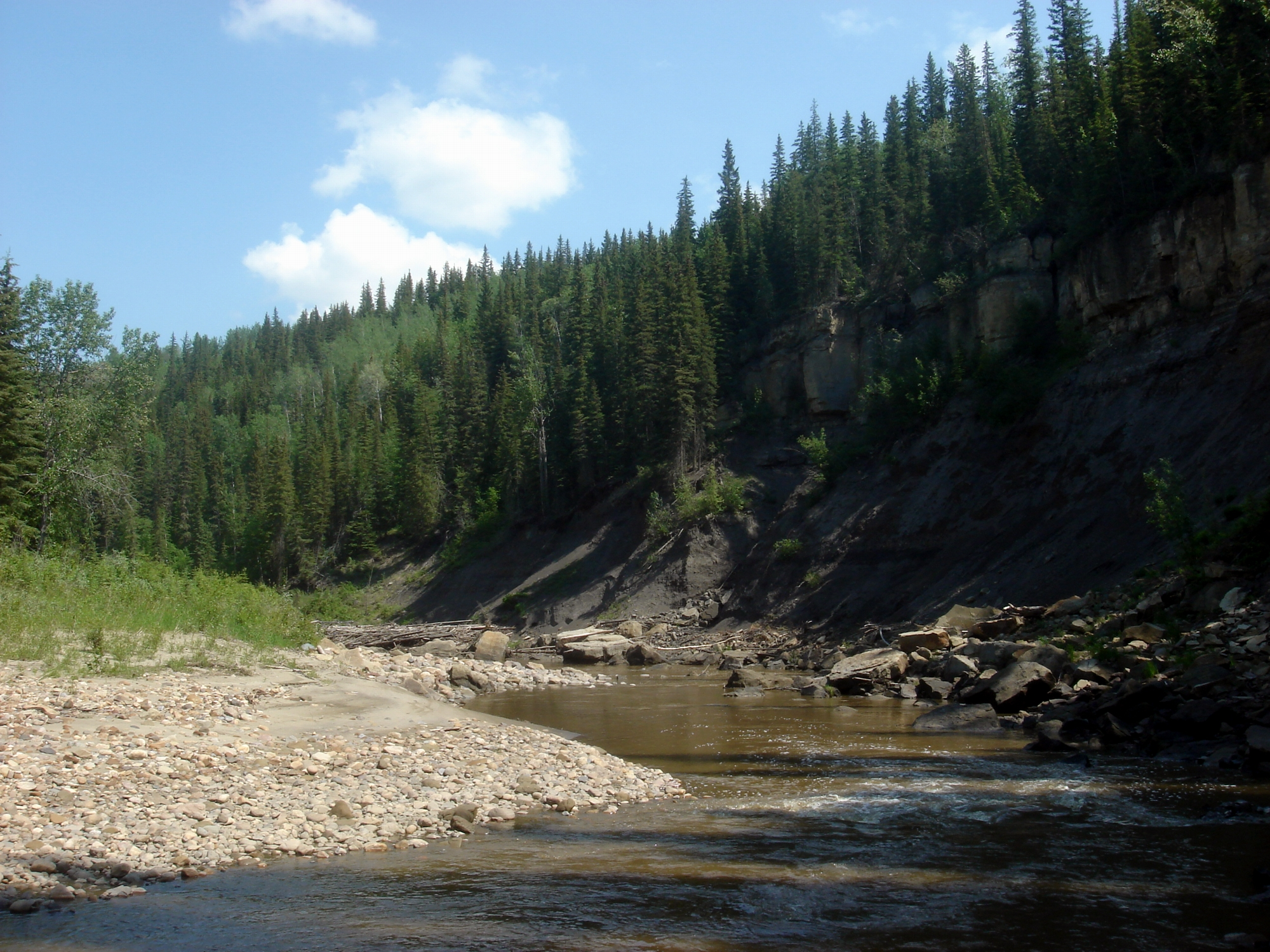
- Kaskapau Shale exposed along the Pouce Coupe River
- Type: Geological group
- Sub-units: Puskwaskau Formation; Bad Heart Formation; Kaskapau Formation
- Underlies: Wapiti Group
- Overlies: Dunvegan Formation
- Thickness: up to 1,100 feet (340 m)

Lithology
- Primary: Shale, sandstone, siltstone

Location
- Region: Alberta, British Columbia
- Country: Canada

Type section
- Named for: Smoky River
- Named by: George Mercer Dawson, 1881

The Smoky Group is a stratigraphic unit of Late Cretaceous age in the Western Canadian Sedimentary Basin.

It takes the name from the Smoky River and was first described in outcrops along the banks of the Smoky River, Spirit River and Pouce Coupe Rivers by George Mercer Dawson in 1881.

== Lithology ==
The Smoky Group is represented by marine silty shale with ironstone and bentonite streaks. Sandstone occurs at the base and is transitional to the Dunvegan Formation.

=== Hydrocarbon production ===
Gas is produced from the Cardium Formation in the southern reaches of the Group, in central Alberta and northern Alberta.

== Distribution ==
The Kaskapau Shale reaches 477m in the Pouce Coupe River area and thins towards the east in the Smoky River area. The Bad Heart Formation sandstone is up to 8m thick, while the Puskwaskau Formation ranges from 200m in the Pouce Coupe Prairie to 123m in the Spirit River area. The entire group measures up to 677 m (2,220 ft) in the Pouce Coupe Prairie and can reach 1,100 m (3,610 ft) in the Canadian Rockies foothills of northeast British Columbia.

== Relationship to other units ==
The Smoky Group is conformably and transgressively followed by the Wapiti Group and rests conformably on the Dunvegan Formation sandstone. The Cardium sandstone and Muskiki shale are replacing the upper parts of the Kaskapau Formation in the south-east of the distribution area. The entire group correlates with the Blackstone Formation, Cardium Formation and Wapiabi Formation of the Alberta Group in the southern foothills. The equivalent stratigraphic sequence in central Alberta consists of the Lea Park Formation and the upper Colorado Group, in north-eastern Alberta it correlates with Labiche Formation, and with the Kotaneelee Formation in the Liard River area.

=== Subdivisions ===
The Smoky Group has the following sub-divisions from top to bottom:

Sub-unit	Age	Lithology	Max. thickness	Reference
Puskwaskau Formation	Santonian	dark marine shale, siltstone beds	200 m (660 ft)	
Bad Heart Formation	Coniacian	medium to coarse grained marine sandstone	8 m (30 ft)	
Kaskapau Formation	Turonian to Coniacian	dark, fissile shale	900 m (2,950 ft)	
Basal sandstone tongues
Howard Creek Member	late Cenomanian	fine to medium grained glauconitic sandstone	4 m (10 ft)	
Doe Creek Member	Cenomanian	fine grained sandstone	25 m (80 ft)	
Pouce Coupe Member	Cenomanian	massive, fine grained sandstone	9 m (30 ft)	

The Kaskapau Formation is equivalent to the sum of Blackstone Formation, Cardium Formation and Muskiki Formation.

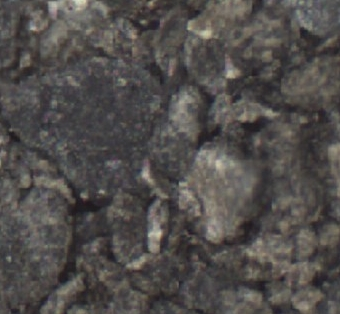
Paskwaskau Shale

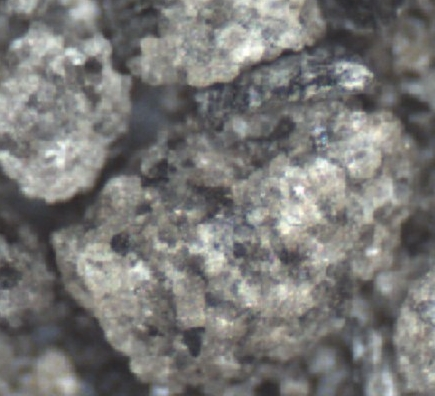
Bad Heart Sandstone

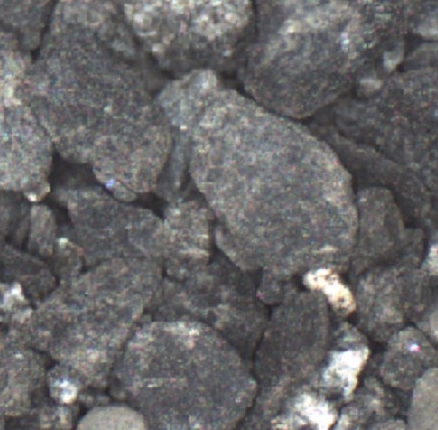
Kaskapau Shale
