= Asiamericana =

Asiamericana Temporal range: Late Cretaceous, 90 Ma

Scientific classification
- Kingdom: Animalia
- Phylum: Chordata
- Class: Reptilia
- Clade: Dinosauria
- Clade: Saurischia
- Clade: Theropoda
- Clade: Coelurosauria
- Genus: †Asiamericana; Nessov, 1995
- Species: †A. asiatica

Binomial name
- †Asiamericana asiatica Nessov, 1995

Synonyms
- Richardoestesia asiatica? Averianov & Sues, 2013

Extinct genus of dinosaurs

Asiamericana is a dubious genus of coelurosaur known only from isolated teeth found in the Bissekty Formation of Uzbekistan. It was named to recognize the occurrence of similar fossil teeth in Central Asia and North America. These regions once formed a connected land mass, during the Cretaceous period.

== Discovery and naming ==
The holotype teeth were discovered during the Uzbek-Russian-British-American-Canadian (URBAC) expedition by Lev Alexandrovich Nessov between 1974 and 1985 and were first described by Nessov (1985). The type species is A. asiatica, which was named and described by Nessov (1995).

The holotype of A. asiatica is CCMGE 460/12457, and two other teeth (ZIN PH 1110/ 16 and ZIN PH 1129/16) are also known. All three teeth are known from the CBI-14 site of the Bissekty Formation of Uzbekistan.

== Description ==
The teeth themselves are straight, lack a constriction at the base, and lack serrations.

== Classification ==
In his initial description of the unusual teeth, Nessov speculated that they may belong to either saurodont fish or to spinosaurid dinosaurs. He later changed his opinion, deciding that they definitely represented theropod remains, and this opinion was followed by most later researchers who excluded them from reviews of spinosaurid teeth for this reason.

However, in 2013, a study assumed that the teeth were identical to those of the possibly dromaeosaurid Richardoestesia isosceles, and renamed the species into Richardoestesia asiatica. A subsequent study confirmed this in 2019.
