= Belly River Group =

Stratigraphical unit of Late Cretaceous age in the Western Canadian Sedimentary Basin

Belly River Formation
- Stratigraphic range: Santonian to Campanian
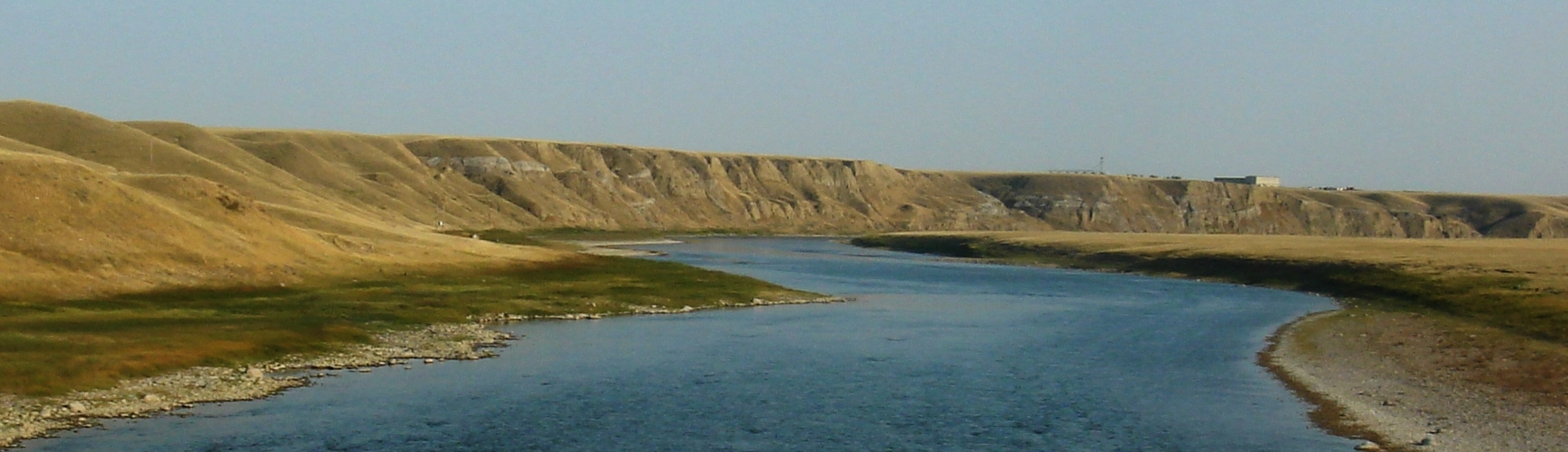
- Belly River beds exposed along the Oldman River
- Type: Group
- Underlies: Bearpaw Formation
- Overlies: Wapiabi Formation
- Thickness: up to 1,300 metres (4,270 ft)

Lithology
- Primary: Sandstone, shale
- Other: Conglomerate, coal, bentonite

Location
- Coordinates: 49.63161°N 112.87537°W
- Region: Alberta
- Country: Canada

Type section
- Named for: Belly River
- Named by: George Mercer Dawson, 1883

The Belly River Group is a stratigraphic unit of Late Cretaceous age in the Western Canadian Sedimentary Basin.

It takes the name from the Belly River, a tributary of the Oldman River in southern Alberta, and was first described in outcrop on the banks of the Oldman River (at the time considered part of the Belly River) and Bow River by George Mercer Dawson in 1883.

== Lithology ==
The Belly River Group is composed of very fine grained sandstone with coarse grained beds and minor bentonite, coal, green shale, and concretionary beds.

=== Hydrocarbon production ===
Gas is produced from the Belly River Group in the Deep Basin, in west-central Alberta and in the Canadian Rockies foothills.

== Paleofauna ==
Dinosaur remains are among the fossils that have been recovered from the formation.

Dinosaurs reported from the Belly River Group
Genus	Species	Location	Stratigraphic position	Material	Description	Images
Montanoceratops	Indeterminate					Montanoceratops

== Distribution ==
The Belly River Group reaches a maximum thickness of 1,300 metres (4,270 ft) in its western reaches, and thins out eastward to about 350 metres (1,150 ft) in the Canadian Plains. It is found throughout southern Alberta, and as far east as eastern Saskatchewan. From south to north, it is present from the United States border to the Wapiti River region, south of the Peace River Country.

== Relationship to other units ==
The Belly River Group is conformably overlain by the Bearpaw Formation and gradually overlies the Wapiabi Formation, the Colorado Group shale or the Lea Park Formation shale.

It is equivalent to the Milk River Formation and Pakowki Formation. The Belly River has group status in the Canadian Rockies foothills and is replaced by the Oldman Formation (Judith River Formation in Montana) and Foremost Formation in southern Alberta.

== See also ==
- List of dinosaur-bearing rock formations
