= Whitefish River (Yukon) =

River in Canada

Location
- Country: Canada
- Territory: Yukon

Physical characteristics
- Source: Balsam Lake (Northwest Territories)
  - coordinates: 60°50′39″N 125°56′10″W
  - elevation: 1,107 m (3,632 ft)
- Mouth: Beaver River
  - coordinates: 60°11′23″N 125°03′00″W
  - elevation: 407 m (1,335 ft)
- Length: 115 km (71 mi)

The Whitefish River is a river in southeastern Yukon, Canada and is in the Mackenzie River and Arctic Ocean drainage basins. It begins at Balsam Lake adjacent to Lookout Mountain and on the border to the Northwest Territories, and flows 115 kilometres (71 mi) south to reach its mouth at the Beaver River, which flows via the Liard River to the Mackenzie River.
