= Judith River Group =

Group of geologic formations in North America

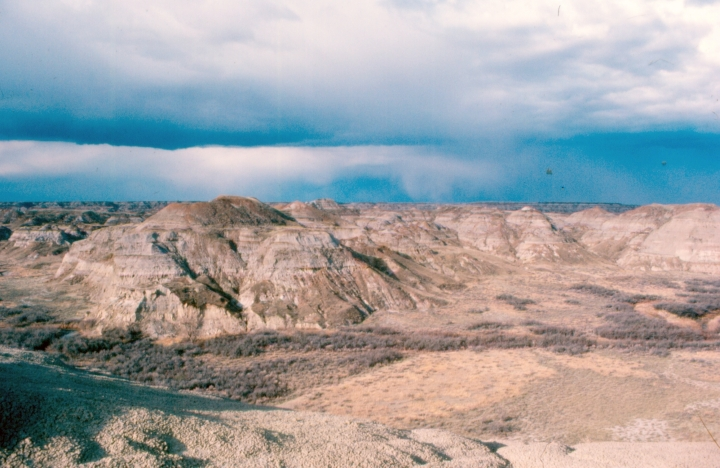
Dinosaur Park Formation in Dinosaur Provincial Park, Alberta

The Judith River Group is a group of geologic formations in western North America dating from the late Cretaceous and noted as a site for the extensive excavation of dinosaur fossils. The formation is named after the Judith River in Montana. The group is also called the Judith River Wedge. It is stratigraphically equivalent with the Belly River Group in Alberta.

It comprises the Judith River Formation in north central Montana, as well as the Foremost, Oldman, and Dinosaur Park formations in Alberta and Saskatchewan in Canada. The wedge is exposed discontinuously in river drainages.
