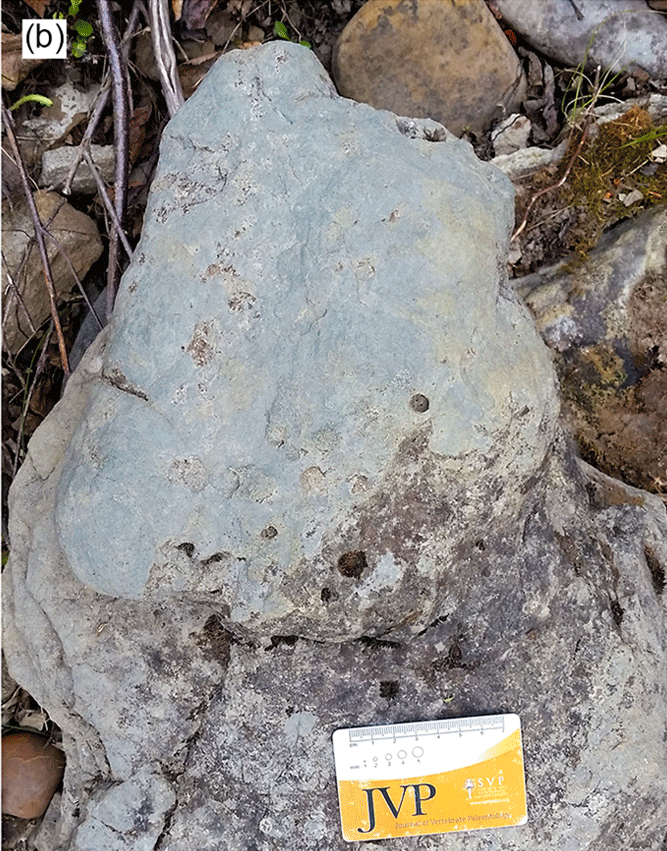
- Tetrapodosaurus borealis from the Dunvegan Formation of Canada

Trace fossil classification
- Ichnofamily: Tetrapodosauridae
- Ichnogenus: Tetrapodosaurus; Sternberg, 1932

= Tetrapodosaurus =

Dinosaur footprint

Tetrapodosaurus is an ichnogenus of dinosaur footprint found in Canada and the United States (Patuxent Formation), likely representing the tracks of a non-ankylosaurid ankylosaur.

Tetrapodosaurus was first identified by Charles Mortram Sternberg in 1932 along the Peace River, and it is characterized by tetradactyl (four-toed) pes prints which were created by non-ankylosaurid ankylosaurs such as 'nodosaurids' and similar taxa.

== See also ==
- Ruopodosaurus – ichnogenus representing anyklosaurid tracks
- List of dinosaur ichnogenera
