= Muskiki Formation =

Geologic formation in Canada

- Stratigraphic range: Late Cretaceous
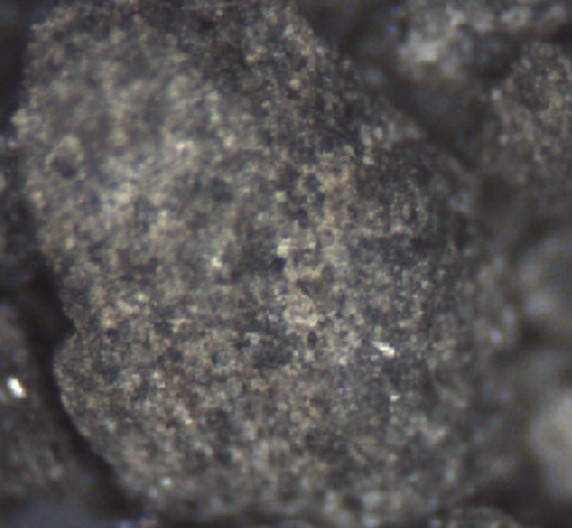
- Muskiki_Shale
- Type: Geological formation
- Unit of: Smoky Group
- Underlies: Bad Heart Formation
- Overlies: Cardium Formation
- Thickness: up to 99 metres (320 ft)

Lithology
- Primary: Shale
- Other: Sandstone

Location
- Coordinates: 52.79637°N 116.89245°W
- Region: Alberta
- Country: Canada

Type section
- Named for: Muskiki Lake
- Named by: D.F. Stott, 1963

The Muskiki Formation is a stratigraphic unit of Late Cretaceous age in the Western Canadian Sedimentary Basin.

The formation is named after Muskiki Lake and Muskiki Creek, a tributary of the Cardinal River, and was first described in an outcrop along the Thistle Creek, north of Muskiki Lake, in the Bighorn Range, by D.F. Stott in 1963. The name is of Cree origin ("maskihkîy"), meaning medicine.

== Lithology ==
The Muskiki Formation is composed of shale with pebbly mudstone. Poorly sorted sandstone and concretionary beds also occur. In the western areal it becomes more silty.

== Distribution ==
The Muskiki Formation is 99 metres (320 ft) thick at its type locality at Thistle Creek. It thins out towards the south and east. It occurs in the Canadian Rockies foothills from the Highwood River in the south to the Berland River, north of the Athabasca River and into north-eastern British Columbia.

== Relationship to other units ==
The Muskiki Formationis is part of the Smoky Group. It is conformably underlain by the Cardium Formation and conformably overlain by the Bad Heart Formation.

The Kaskapau Formation in northern Alberta replaces the upper Blackstone Formation, the Cardium Formation, and the Muskiki Formation. Where the Kaskapau Formation includes post Cardium beds, the Muskiki is considered a member of the Wapiabi Formation.
