= Milk River Formation =

Geologic formation in Alberta, Canada

- Stratigraphic range: Santonian-Campanian; ~84.1–83.6 Ma
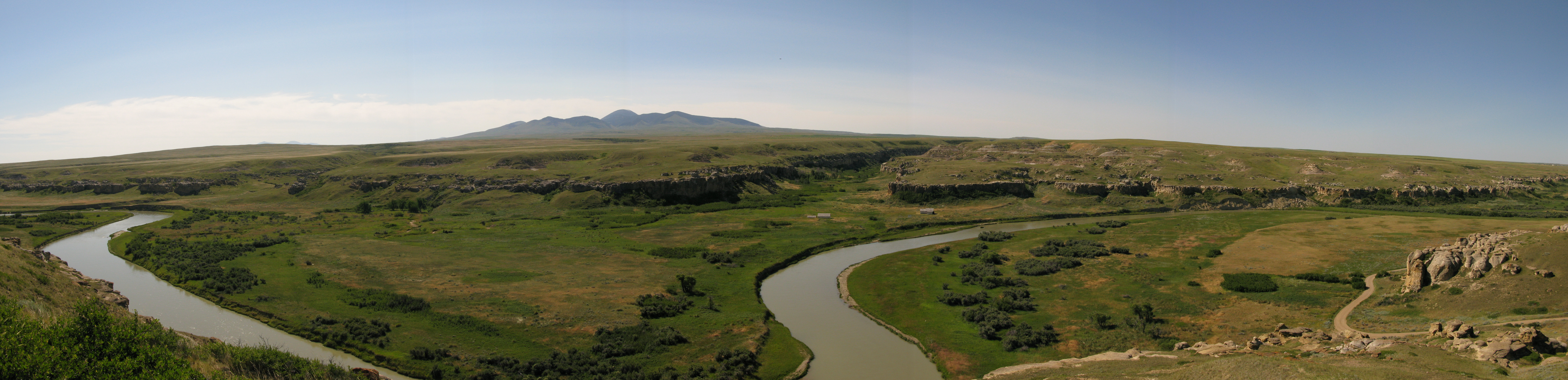
- Outcrops along the Milk River
- Type: Geological formation
- Unit of: Montana Group
- Sub-units: Deadhorse Coulee Member; Virgelle Member; Telegraph Creek Member
- Underlies: Pakowki Formation
- Overlies: Colorado Group
- Thickness: up to 113 metres (370 ft)

Lithology
- Primary: Sandstone
- Other: Siltstone, shale, coal

Location
- Region: Alberta
- Country: Canada

Type section
- Named for: Milk River
- Named by: D.B. Dowling, 1916

The Milk River Formation is a sandstone-dominated stratigraphic unit of the Western Canada Sedimentary Basin in southern Alberta, Canada. It was deposited in near-shore to coastal environments during Late Cretaceous (late Santonian to early Campanian) time. Based on uranium-lead dating, palynology and stratigraphic relationships, deposition occurred between ~84.1 and 83.6 Ma.

The sandstones of the Virgelle Member in the centre of the formation are well-exposed at Writing-on-Stone Provincial Park in southwestern Alberta, where they bear petroglyphs carved into them by First Nations people.

The formation is fossiliferous and has yielded an extensive vertebrate fauna (see tables below), as well as fossil ammonites. In some areas it hosts shallow natural gas reservoirs.

The area was probably a dense forest during the Late Cretaceous with conifers from the Yew family being common alongside flowering plants like magnolias and figs. The ground was covered in horsetails and sensitive ferns.

== Stratigraphy and lithology ==
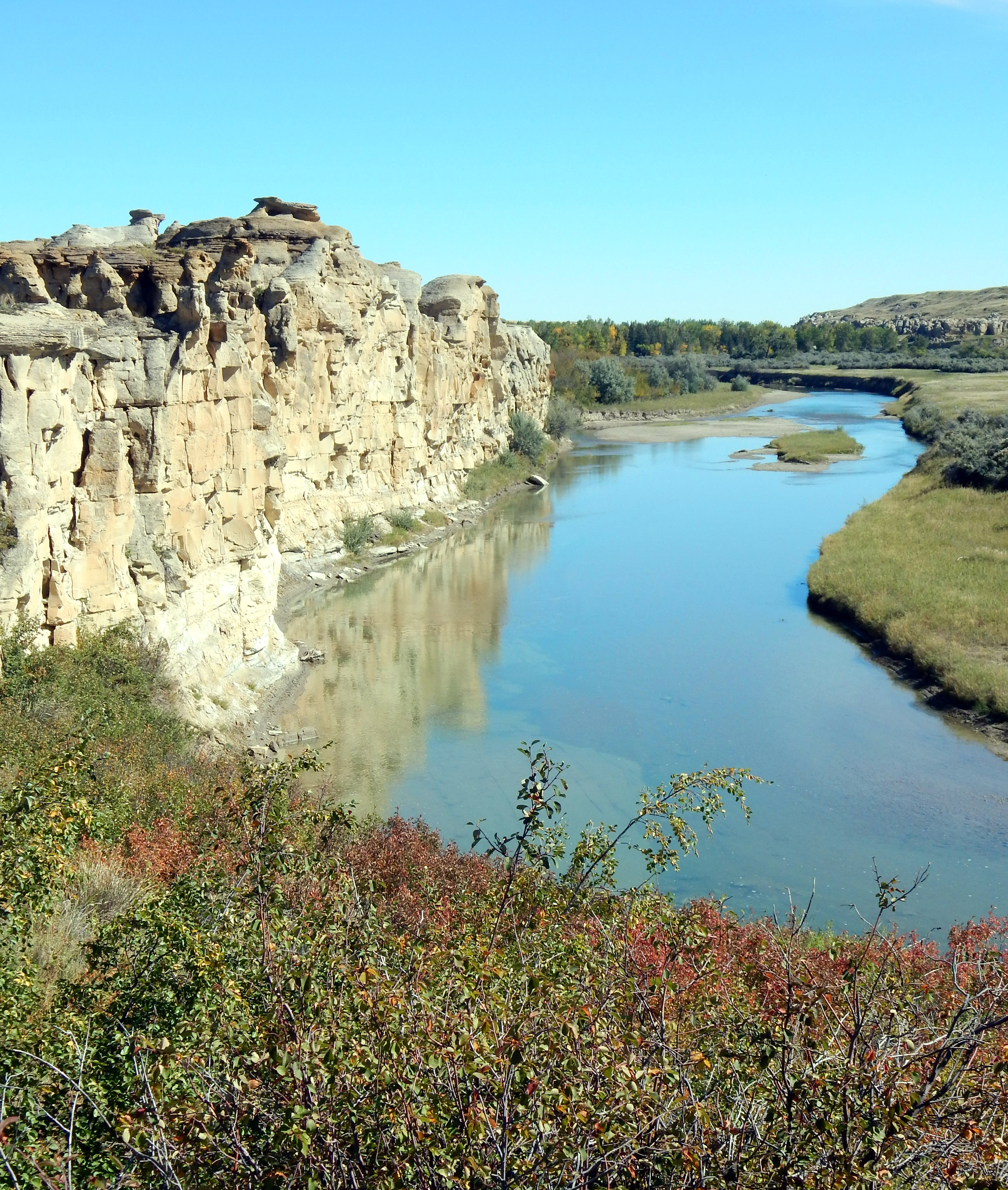
Sandstones of the Milk River Formation at Writing-on-Stone Provincial Park

The Milk River Formation is an eastward-thinning wedge of clastic sediments that was deposited along the western margin of the Western Interior Seaway during Late Cretaceous (late Santonian to early Campanian) time. It is age-equivalent to the marine shales of the Lea Park Formation in southeastern Alberta, and to the Eagle and Telegraph Creek Formations of north-central Montana.

In Alberta it is subdivided into the following three members:

- Telegraph Creek Member, at the base, consists primarily of mudstones and shales deposited in offshore marine settings. It has produced the ammonite index fossil Desmoscaphites bassleri, which indicates an age of ~84. Ma.
- Virgelle Member, the central member, is a sequence of massive, cliff-forming, yellow to white sandstones that were deposited in shoreface and tidal channel environments. It can be seen at Writing-on-Stone Provincial Park.
- Deadhorse Coulee Member, at the top, consists of predominantly nonmarine shales, siltstones, sandstones, and coal beds that were deposited in rivers, floodplains and swamps. Most of the vertebrate fossils have come from this member.

== Vertebrates ==
(references: Brinkman 2003; Gao and Fox 1995; Hilton and Grande 2006; Larson 2008; Sullivan 2003; University of Alberta webpage)

=== Cartilaginous fishes ===
Remains of an indeterminate lamnid genus and species are present.

Cartilaginous fishes reported from the Milk River Formation
Genus	Species	Location	Stratigraphic position	Material	Notes
Lonchidion	Indeterminate				Hybodontoidea
Myledaphus	M. bipartitus				Rhinobatoidei

=== Bony fishes ===
Remains of Acipenseridae, Amiidae, Esocidae, indeterminate genera and species.

Bony fishes reported from the Milk River Formation
Genus	Species	Location	Stratigraphic position	Material	Notes	Images
Belonostomus	Indeterminate				Aspidorhynchidae	Belonostomus Lepisosteus
Lepisosteus	L. occidentalis				Lepisosteidae	Belonostomus Lepisosteus
Palaeolabrus	Indeterminate				Lepisosteidae	Belonostomus Lepisosteus

=== Amphibians ===
Amphibians reported from the Milk River Formation
Genus	Species	Location	Stratigraphic position	Material	Notes	Images
Albanerpeton	A. galaktion				Albanerpetontidae	Albanerpeton
Albanerpeton	A. nexuosus				Albanerpetontidae	Albanerpeton
Opisthotriton	Indeterminate				Batrachosauroididae	Albanerpeton

=== Squamates ===
Indeterminate Anguidae and Xenosauridae genera and species.

Squamates reported from the Milk River Formation
Genus	Species	Location	Stratigraphic position	Material	Notes
Aocnodromeus	A. corrugatus				Scincidae
Chamops	Indeterminate				Teiidae
Coniophis	cf. C. precedens				Aniliidae
Cnephasaurus	C. locustivorus				Iguanidae
Glyptogenys	G. ornata				Teiidae
Parasaniwa?	Indeterminate				Necrosauridae
Penemabuya	P. antecessor				Scincidae
Sphenosiagon	S. simplex				Teiidae

=== Turtles ===
Indeterminate Solemydidae and Trionychidae genera and species.

Turtles reported from the Milk River Formation
Genus	Species	Location	Stratigraphic position	Material	Notes
Adocus	Indeterminate				Adocidae
Basilemys	Indeterminate				Nanhsiungchelyidae
?Boremys	Indeterminate				Baenidae
?Compsemys	Indeterminate				Family indeterminant
Neurankylus	N. lithographicus				Baenidae
Plesiobaena	Indeterminate				Baenidae

=== Crocodilians ===
Crocodilians reported from the Milk River Formation
Genus	Species	Location	Stratigraphic position	Material	Notes
Gilchristosuchus	G. palatinus				

=== Dinosaurs ===
Indeterminate Ankylosauridae, Aves, Ceratopsidae, Dromaeosauridae, Hadrosauridae, Nodosauridae, Ornithomimidae, Pachycephalosauridae, Protoceratopsidae, Thescelosauridae, and Tyrannosauridae genera and species.

Color key: Taxon / Reclassified taxon / Taxon falsely reported as present / Dubious taxon or junior synonym / Ichnotaxon / Ootaxon / Morphotaxon	Notes; Uncertain or tentative taxa are in small text; ~~crossed out~~ taxa are discredited.

Dinosaurs reported from the Milk River Formation
Genus	Species	Location	Stratigraphic position	Material	Notes	Images
Lithostrotia	Indeterminate			Caudal centrum	An indeterminate Titanosaurian sauropod, the first from Canada. Cited to be similar to caudals referred to Alamosaurus.	
Acrotholus	A. audeti			Skull domes	A pachycephalosaur	Acrotholus Saurornitholestes
Brachyceratops	Indeterminate					Acrotholus Saurornitholestes
Continuoolithus	cf. C. canadensis			One eggshell fragment	Laid by a theropod	Acrotholus Saurornitholestes
Gryphoceratops	G. morrisoni			Partial right dentary	A leptoceratopsid	Acrotholus Saurornitholestes
Kritosaurus	Indeterminate					Acrotholus Saurornitholestes
Palaeoscincus	Indeterminate					Acrotholus Saurornitholestes
cf. Paronychodon	cf. P. lacustris				Theropoda incertae sedis	Acrotholus Saurornitholestes
Porituberoolithus	cf. P. warnerensis			One eggshell fragment	Laid by a theropod	Acrotholus Saurornitholestes
Prismatoolithus	Indeterminate			6 isolated eggshell fragments	Laid by a theropod	Acrotholus Saurornitholestes
cf. Richardoestesia	cf. R. gilmorei				Maniraptora incertae sedis	Acrotholus Saurornitholestes
cf. Richardoestesia	cf. R. isosceles				Maniraptora incertae sedis	Acrotholus Saurornitholestes
Saurornitholestes	S. langstoni				Dromaeosauridae	Acrotholus Saurornitholestes
Spheroolithus	cf. S. choteauensis			313 isolated eggshell fragments	Laid by an ornithopod	Acrotholus Saurornitholestes
Triprismatoolithus	Indeterminate			60 isolated eggshell fragments	Laid by a bird or theropod	Acrotholus Saurornitholestes

=== Mammals ===
==== Other mammals ====
Other mammals reported from the Milk River Formation
Genus	Species	Location	Stratigraphic position	Material	Notes
Alticonodon	A. lindoei				Triconodontidae
Cimexomys	C. antiquus				Neoplagiaulacidae?
Cimexomys	C. magister				Neoplagiaulacidae?
Cimolodon	C. electus				Cimolodontidae
Cimolodon	C. similis				Cimolodontidae
Cimolomys	Indeterminate				Cimolomyidae
Ectypodus	cf. E. powelli				
Meniscoessus	M. ferox				Cimolomyidae
Mesodma	Mesodma senecta				
Mesodma	Indeterminate				
Mictodon	Mictodon simpsoni				Tinodontidae
Paracimexomys	P. magister				Family indeterminent
Paranyctoides	Paranyctoides maleficus				Nyctitheriidae
Picopsis	P. pattersoni				Picopsidae
Picopsis	Indeterminate				Picopsidae
Potamotelses	P. aquilensis				Potamotelsidae
Symmetrodontoides	S. canadensis				Spalacotheriidae
Viridomys	V. orbatus				Neoplagiaulacidae?

==== Didelphomorphs ====
Didelphomorphs reported from the Milk River Formation
Genus	Species	Location	Stratigraphic position	Material	Notes	Images
Albertatherium	A. primus				Peradectidae	Alphadon Didelphodon
Albertatherium	A. secundus				Peradectidae	Alphadon Didelphodon
Alphadon	A. halleyi				Peradectidae	Alphadon Didelphodon
Alphadon	Indeterminate				Peradectidae	Alphadon Didelphodon
Aquiladelphis	A. incus				Aquiladelphidae	Alphadon Didelphodon
Aquiladelphis	A. minor				Aquiladelphidae	Alphadon Didelphodon
Didelphodon	Indeterminate				Stagodontidae	Alphadon Didelphodon
Eodelphis	Indeterminate				Stagodontidae	Alphadon Didelphodon
Iqualadelphis	I. lactea				Pediomyidae	Alphadon Didelphodon
Pediomys	cf. P. clemensi				Pediomyidae	Alphadon Didelphodon
Pediomys	P. exiguus				Pediomyidae	Alphadon Didelphodon
Pediomys	P. florencae				Pediomyidae	Alphadon Didelphodon
Protalphadon	P. creber				Peradectidae	Alphadon Didelphodon

== Flora ==
Most of the flora noted here come from the paper cited here.

=== Ferns ===
Ferns reported from the Milk River Formation
Genus	Species	Location	Stratigraphic position	Material	Notes
Cladophlebis	C. simplicima				
Equisetum	E. sp.				
Onoclea	O. hebridica				
Tapeinidium	T. undulatum				

=== Gymnosperms ===
Conifers reported from the Milk River Formation
Genus	Species	Location	Stratigraphic position	Material	Notes
Brachyphyllum	B. douglasi				
Elatocladus	E. albertaensis				
Geinitzia	G. formosa				
Cephalotaxopsis	C. heterophylla				
Sequoia	S. major				
Protophyllocladus	P. polymorpha				

=== Angiosperms ===
Flowering plants reported from the Milk River Formation
Genus	Species	Location	Stratigraphic position	Material	Notes
Trochodendroides	T. arctica				A Katsura relative
Ilex	I. mammillata				
Laurophyllum	L. sp.				A laurel
Alnus	A. perantiqua				
Populites	P. wickendeni				
Ficus	F. trinervis				A fig
Magnolia	M. coalvillensis				A magnolia
Menispermites	M. sp				
Cassia	C. sp.				A legume

== See also ==
- List of dinosaur-bearing rock formations
