= Timpas Creek =

Stream in Colorado, U.S.

Coordinates: 38°01′30″N 103°37′57″W

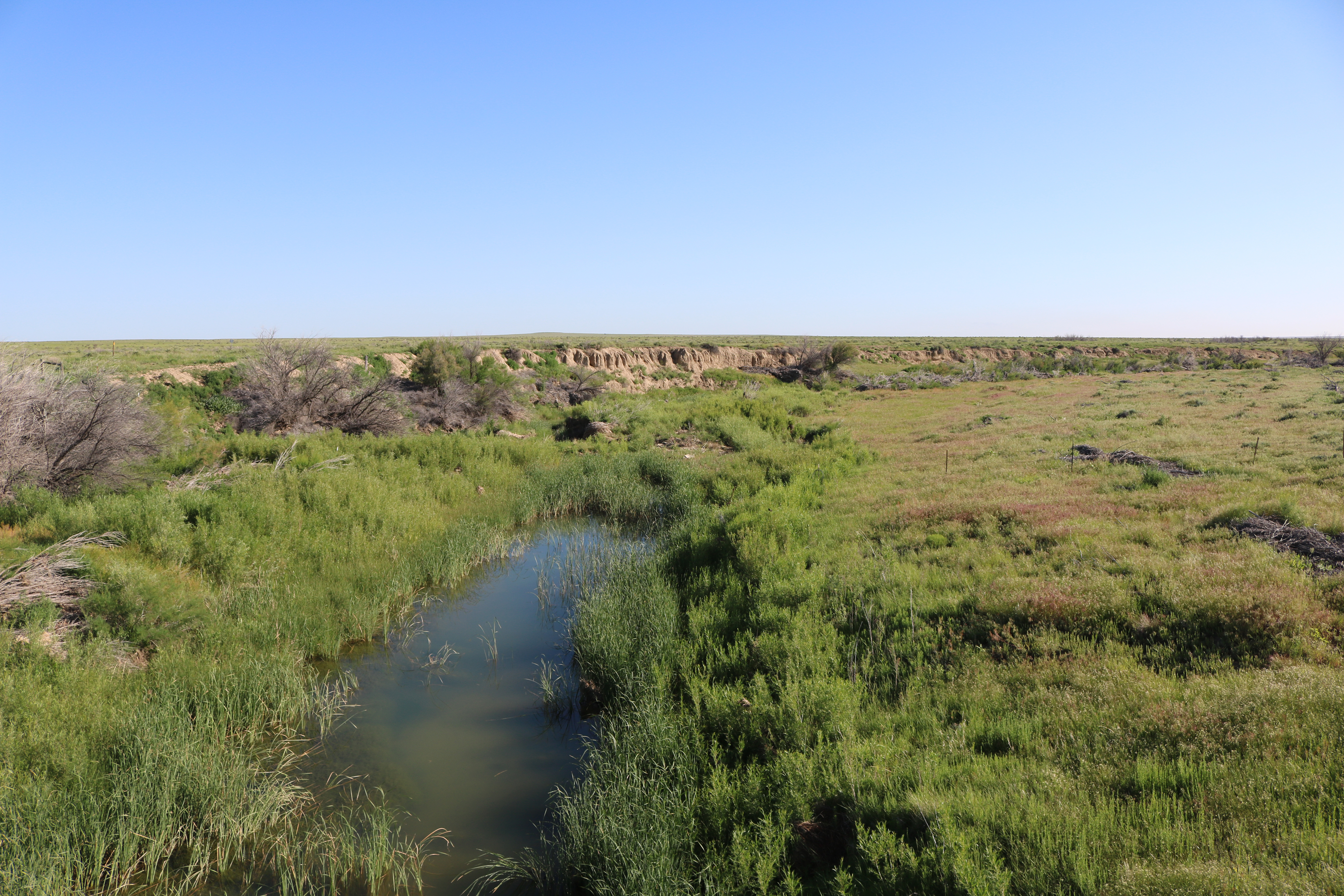
Timpas Creek in Timpas, Colorado.

Timpas Creek is a stream in the U.S. state of Colorado.

There is some uncertainty in the origin of the place name Timpas. The area's first European explorers and settlers were Spanish, then Mexican. Timpa or timpas is Spanish for tympstone, the port of a blast furnace from which molten slag drains. Alternatively, timpas can also be interpreted as "furnace hearth" or any home stone fireplace hearth — of the shaley and marly rocks of the Colorado Group, the locally quarried Timpas Limestone would be the thickest and least unsuitable stone for the job.

John Dawson, writing in 1954 in Place names in Colorado, states that the creek was named for the Cretaceous "Timpas Limestone" quarried near the mouth of the creek on to the Arkansas River, and is still quarried today on the bluffs southeast of Rocky Ford. However, G.K. Gilbert, when reporting on the geology of the Arkansas River in 1896, naming new units to replace the old Benton Shale, acknowledged that the Timpas was already a local name for the limestone outcropping over the bluffs of the creek, suggesting that the limestone was named for the creek.

Gilbert recognized that the Timpas Limestone correlated with the Fort Hays Limestone; and, in 1964, the name Timpas Limestone was abandoned, replaced by Fort Hays Limestone.

== See also ==
- List of rivers of Colorado
