= Lea Park Formation =

Geologic formation in Canada

- Stratigraphic range: Early Campanian
- Type: Geological formation
- Underlies: Judith River Formation
- Overlies: First White Speckled Shale
- Thickness: up to 270 metres (890 ft)

Lithology
- Primary: Shale
- Other: Siltstone

Location
- Coordinates: 53.65427°N 110.3302°W
- Region: Alberta
- Country: Canada

Type section
- Named for: Lea Park, Alberta
- Named by: J.A. Allan, 1918

The Lea Park Formation is a stratigraphical unit of Late Cretaceous age in the Western Canadian Sedimentary Basin, Canada.

It takes the name from the settlement of Lea Park, Alberta, located north-west of Lloydminster on the banks of the North Saskatchewan River. It was first defined in an outcrop on the river banks, located in section 15-11-54-3W4M by J.A. Allan in 1918. The early campanian age was determined from its foraminifera and mollusks found in the formation.

== Lithology ==
The Lea Park Formation is composed of dark shale with minor siltstone. Calcite veins and ironstone concretions, as well as bentonite beds are found throughout the formation.

== Distribution ==
The Lea Park Formation reaches a maximum depth of 270 metres (890 ft) in its eastern reaches. It occurs in the sub-surface in west-central Alberta and extends eastwards through north-eastern Alberta and north-western Saskatchewan.

== Relationship to other units ==
The Lea Park Formation is conformably overlain (and laterally replaced )by the Judith River Formation and conformably overlies the First White Speckled Shale of the Colorado Group.

It is equivalent to Judith River Formation, Clagett Formation and Eagle Formation in northern Montana, and is replaced by the Belly River Formation, Pakowki Formation and Milk River Formation in southern Alberta. In eastern Saskatchewan and in Manitoba it is equivalent to the Gammon Ferruginous Member, Pembina Member and lower Millwood Member of the Pierre Shale. The Lower Lea Park correlates with the Puskwaskau Formation in north-western Alberta, and the entire formation is equivalent to part of the Wapiabi Formation in the northern Canadian Rockies
