= Timpas, Colorado =

Unincorporated community in Otero County, CO, USA

- Unincorporated community
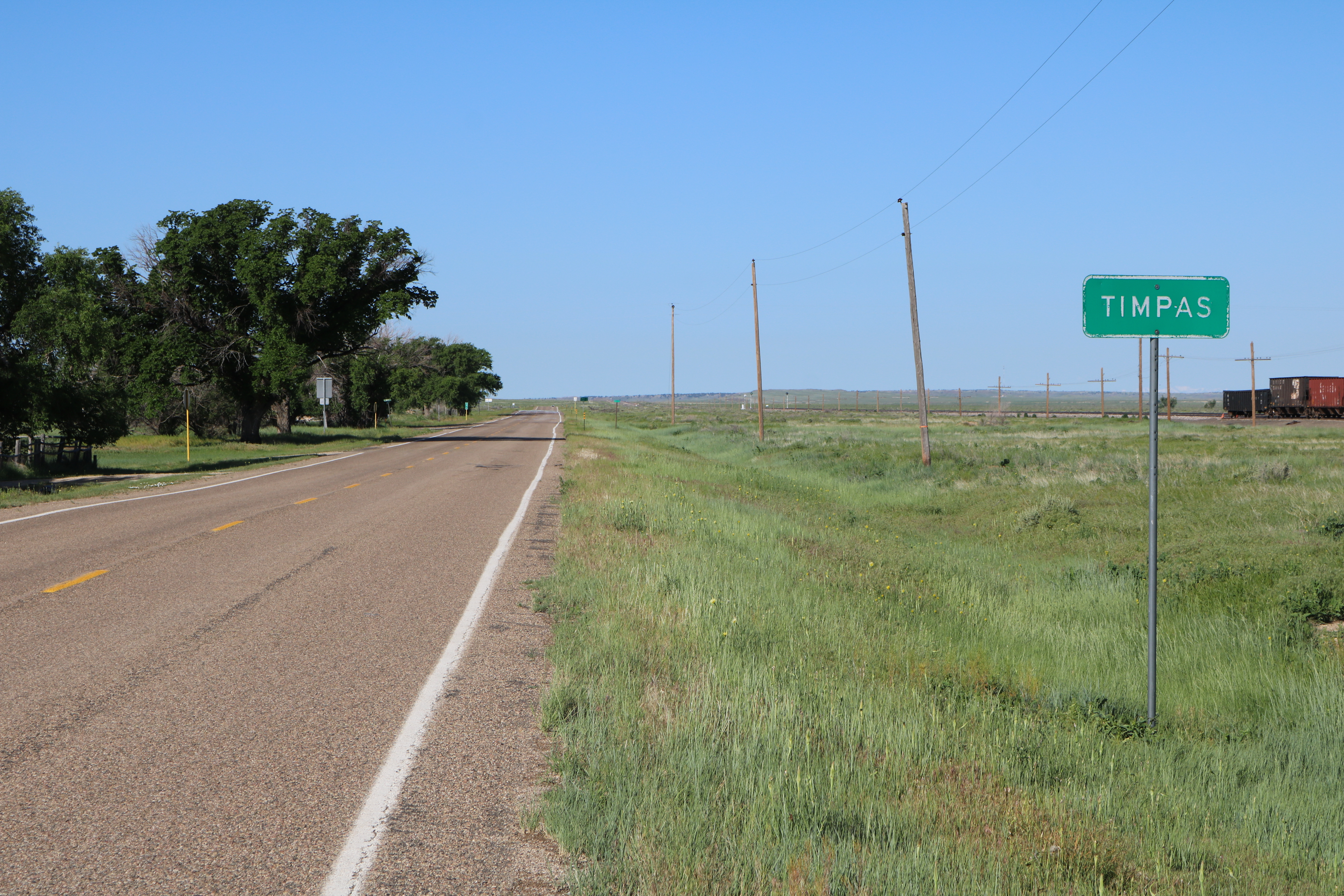
- Timpas and U.S. Route 350.

- Location in Otero County and the state of Colorado Timpas, Colorado (the United States)
- Coordinates: 37°49′05″N 103°46′27″W
- Country: United States
- State: Colorado
- County: Otero County
- Elevation: 4,430 ft (1,350 m)
- Time zone: UTC-7 (MST)
  - Summer (DST): UTC-6 (MDT)
- ZIP code: 81050 (La Junta)
- Area code: 719
- GNIS feature ID: 195713

Timpas is an unincorporated community located in Otero County, Colorado, United States. The U.S. Post Office at La Junta (ZIP Code 81050) now serves Timpas postal addresses.

A post office called Timpas was established in 1891, and remained in operation until 1970. The community took its name from nearby Timpas Creek.
