= Lea Park, Alberta =

Coordinates: 53°39′20″N 110°20′25″W

Location of Lea Park in Alberta

Lea Park is an unincorporated community in Alberta, Canada. It is located in east-central Alberta, between Lloydminster and Bonnyville.

The community was established on the banks of the North Saskatchewan River at its confluence with the Vermilion River, at an elevation of 545 meters (1,788 ft). The Jubilee Regional Park, administered by the village of Marwayne, is located north of the community, along with the Lea Park golf course.

The community gives the name to the Cretaceous age Lea Park Formation, which was described in an outcrop near Lea Park in 1918.

== See also ==
- List of communities in Alberta
