= Cardium Formation =

Stratigraphic range in western Canada

- Stratigraphic range: Turonian to Coniacian
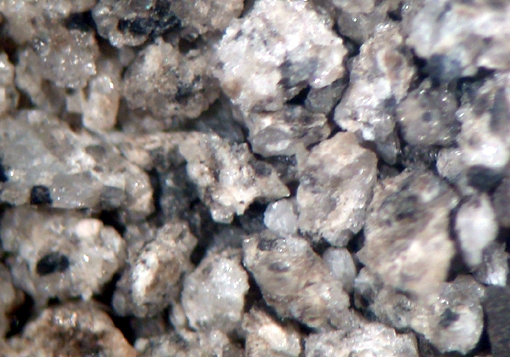
- Photomicrograph of drill cuttings from Cardium Formation sandstone
- Type: Geological formation
- Unit of: Alberta Group, Colorado Group, Smoky Group
- Sub-units: Sturrock Member, Leyland Member, Cardinal Member, Kiska Member, Moosehound Member, Ram Member.
- Underlies: Wapiabi Formation
- Overlies: Blackstone Formation, Kaskapau Formation
- Thickness: 22 metres (70 ft) to 109 metres (360 ft)

Lithology
- Primary: Sandstone
- Other: Shale

Location
- Coordinates: 51.14101°N 114.99446°W
- Region: Western Alberta, and northeastern British Columbia
- Country: Canada

Type section
- Named for: Cardium shells
- Named by: James Hector, 1895

The Cardium Formation is a stratigraphic unit of Late Cretaceous age in the Western Canada Sedimentary Basin. It takes the name from the fossilized heart-shaped cockle shells in the family Cardiidae (from Greek καρδίᾱ kardiā, "heart") present. It was first described along the Bow River banks by James Hector in 1895. It is present throughout western Alberta and in northeastern British Columbia, and it is a major source of petroleum and natural gas.

== Lithology ==
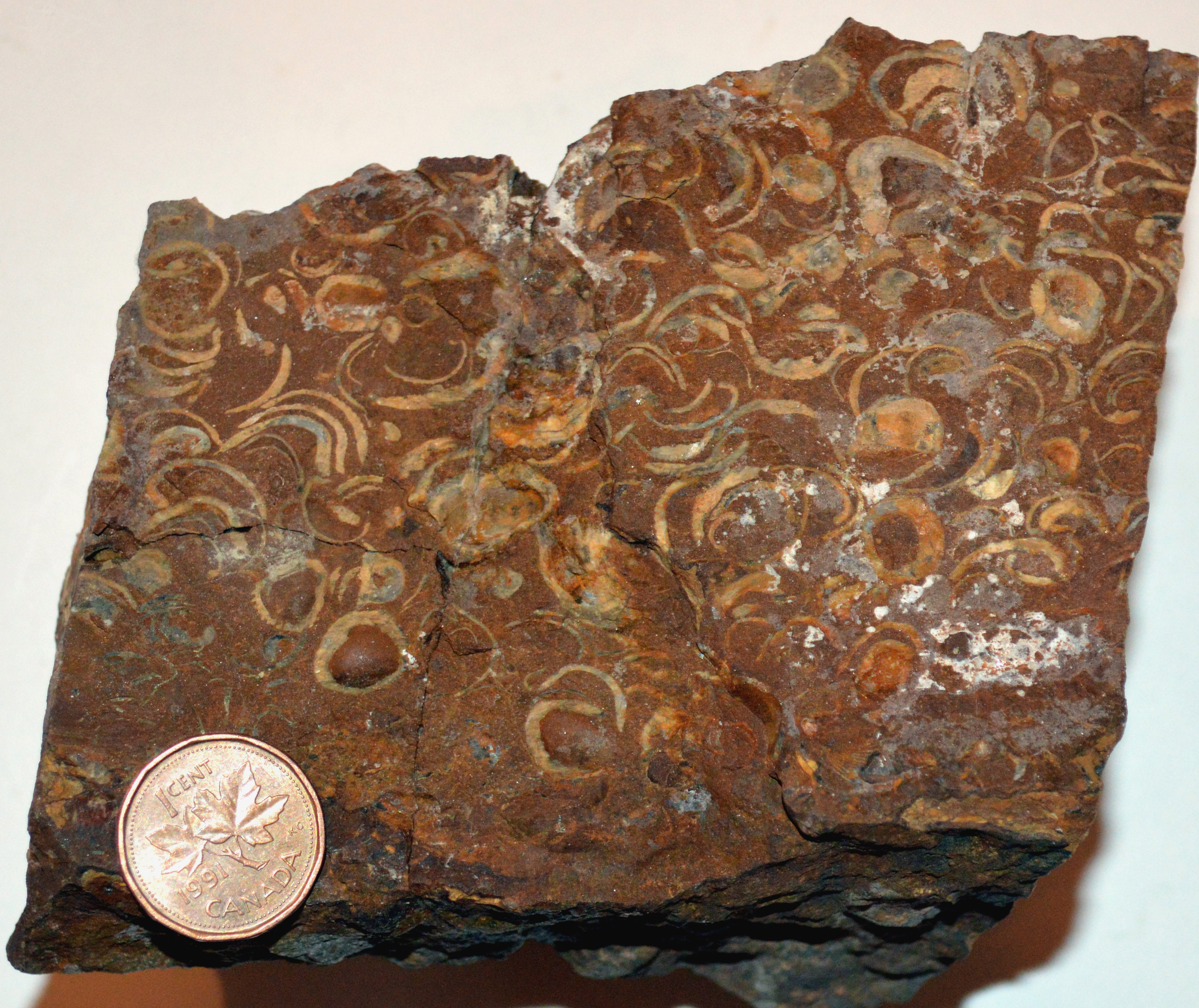
Fossil Cardiidae shells in Cardium Formation sandstone

The Cardium Formation is composed primarily of beds of massive, fine-grained to conglomeratic sandstone, which are separated by thick layers of shale. The formation is subdivided into the following members, from top to base:

- Sturrock Member (sandstone)
- Leyland Member (shale)
- Cardinal Member (sandstone)
- Kiska Member (shale)
- Moosehound Member (shale)
- Ram Member (sandstone)

In central Alberta, the formation is divided into the Pembina River Member and Cardium Zone.

== Distribution ==
The Cardium Formation was deposited during the Turonian and Coniacian stages of the Late Cretaceous along the western edge of the Alberta Foreland Basin. It extends northward from the Canada-United States border to northeastern British Columbia near Dawson Creek, and eastward from the foothills of the Canadian Rockies into the plains of southern and central Alberta. Beyond there, the sandstones grade into shale. Thickness of Cardium sand varies between 5 and 30 meters in Alberta, Canada.

== Relationship to other units ==
Due to its large areal extent, the Cardium Formation falls within different stratigraphic groups in different regions (Alberta Group, Colorado Group, and Smoky Group). It is conformably overlain by the Wapiabi Formation and underlain by the Blackstone Formation. The formation is partly equivalent to the Kaskapau Formation.

== Hydrocarbon production ==
Natural gas is produced from the Cardium Formation in the Athabasca River area and the foothills in western Alberta, and oil is produced in the Pembina oil field of central Alberta. The sandstones of the formation have good storage potential and stratigraphic traps are formed by the thick overlying shales of the Wapiabi Formation and Muskiki Formation, while the underlying black shale of the Blackstone Formation and Kaskapau Formation are good source rocks.

The Cardium Formation had an initial established recoverable oil reserve of 305 million m³, with 220.9 million m³ already produced as of 2008. Gas reserves totaled 88.3 million e³m³, with 30.8 million e³m³ already produced.

Drilling for oil in the Cardium Formation rebounded in 2009 when horizontal drilling and multi-stage fracturing technology increased the oil recovery factor. Driven by technology, drilling in the four decades old Pembina oil field increased, re-launching the field to the center of Alberta's oil economy.

== Hydraulic fracturing in Canada ==
Massive hydraulic fracturing has been widely used in Alberta since the late 1970s. The method is currently used in development of the Cardium, Duvernay, Montney and Viking formations in Alberta, Bakken formation in Saskatchewan, Montney and Horn River formations in British Columbia.

=== Public companies ===
The year 2009 saw consolidation, with land sales, corporate transactions, and public companies with Cardium assets acquired by those intending to apply newer recovery-techniques to improve field economics. Oil-and-gas companies participating in this activity include:

- PetroBakken (TSX: PBN, through its acquisitions of Berens Energy, Result Energy and Rondo Petroleum)
- Daylight Resources Trust (TSX: DAY, through its acquisition of Highpine Energy and merger with West Energy, TSX: WTL)
- PennWest (TSX: PWT.UN, with a large land base)
- Paramount Resources (TSX: POU, through its acquisition of Profound Energy)
- Bonterra Energy
- Crescent Point Energy (TSX: CPG, through its acquisition of TriAxon Resources)

and the smaller Bellatrix (TSX: BXE), Delphi Energy (TSX: DEE), Peyto Energy Trust (TSX: PEY.UN). Dozens of other companies have land leases in the Cardium fairway, but have not employed horizontal drilling in the Cardium. Exxon Mobil recently started testing the Cardium Formation.
