= West Energy =

West Energy Ltd.
- Company type: Public
- Traded as: TSX: WTL
- Industry: Conventional Oil & Natural Gas
- Fate: Acquired
- Headquarters: Calgary, Alberta, Canada
- Key people: Ken McCagherty
- Number of employees: 18
- Website: www.westenergy.ca

West Energy Ltd. is a Canadian energy exploration company that operates mainly in Western Canada. West is notable for its focus on the Nisku area, as well as its high success rate in terms of finding and drilling wells successfully.

== Overview ==
West was incorporated in December 2002, and went public on October 8, 2004. West has, to date, participated in the drilling of numerous wells and holds interest in a vast amount of land. Since going public, West's shares have quintupled in price, as of January 2007.

In March 2010, it was announced that Daylight Resources Trust (TSX: DAY) will acquire West Energy.

== Management team ==
- Ken McCagherty - President, CEO
- Rick Jaggard - VP of Finance and CFO
- Jack Lane - VP of Operations
- Chris Bennett - VP of Land and Contracts
- Graeme Bloy - VP of Operations

== Board of directors ==
- Ken McCagherty- CEO and President
- Bruce Chernoff
- Keith MacDonald
- Larry Evans
- Keith Greenfield - Corporate Secretary
