= Kotaneelee River =

Location
- Country: Canada
- Territories: Northwest Territories; Yukon

Physical characteristics
- Source
  - location: La Biche Range, Yukon
  - coordinates: 60°49′15.13″N 124°31′57.47″W
  - elevation: 1,600 m (5,200 ft)
- Mouth: Liard River
  - location: Northwest Territories
  - coordinates: 60°10′50.23″N 123°42′01.73″W
  - elevation: 230 m (750 ft)

Basin features
- Tributaries
  - left: Chinkeh Creek

The Kotaneelee River is a river in the Northwest Territories of Canada. It is a tributary of the Liard River.

It gives the name to the Kotaneelee Formation, a stratigraphical unit of the Western Canadian Sedimentary Basin.

== Course ==
The Kotaneelee River originates in Yukon, just west of the Northwest Territories border, on the eastern slopes of the La Biche Range, at an elevation of 1,600 m (5,200 ft). It flows west into the Northwest Territories, then south-east between the La Biche Range and the Northern Kotaneelee Range. It turns again eastwards and separates the Northern and Southern Kotaneelee Ranges. After receiving the waters of the Chinkeh Creek, it turns south and flows parallel and to the west of the Liard Range of the Franklin Mountains. It turns around Mount Pointed and heads east, passing north of Mount Martin and south of Fisherman Lake before it flows into the Liard River, 15 km (9.3 mi) upstream from Fort Liard, at an elevation of 230 m (750 ft).

== Tributaries ==
- Chinkeh Creek - left tributary

== See also ==
- List of rivers of the Northwest Territories
