= Donald E. Hattin =

Donald E. Hattin (1928 – June 24, 2016) was an American geologist and paleontologist, and a geology professor at Indiana University Bloomington for nearly 40 years.

Born in Cohasset, Massachusetts to Edward and Una W. Hattin, Hattin was raised in Scituate, Massachusetts and entered the University of Massachusetts Amherst in 1946, graduating with a Bachelor of Science in 1950. In 1954, Hattin received a Master of Science and a PhD from the University of Kansas in Lawrence, Kansas, where he studied stratigraphy and paleontology under the mentorship of Raymond Cecil Moore. Hattin was an Assistant Professor of Geology at Indiana University Bloomington from 1954 to 1955, when he requested leave to fulfill his ROTC commitment to serve in the United States Air Force during the Korean War. He did not serve in combat, instead being assigned first to Wright-Patterson Air Force Base in Dayton, Ohio, and then to the Icing Research Establishment on New Hampshire's Mount Washington. He attained the rank of Captain before being honorably discharged and returned to teaching at Indiana University in 1957.

He became an associate professor in 1960, and a tenured professor in 1967, continuing in this capacity until his retirement in 1995. Hattin was an author or co-author of "over 100 scientific publications on numerous topics ranging widely across his fields of study", gaining the nickname "Dr. Chalk" for his knowledge of chalk deposits in Cretaceous strata. The Cretaceous shark genus Cretalamna hattini was named for him.

In 1950, Hattin married his high school sweetheart, Marjorie Elizabeth Macy, to whom he was married for the next 65 years until his death. He died from an acute cerebral hemorrhage at the age of 87.

== Writings ==
In addition to his scientific writing, Hattin wrote several books for general readers, including three biographies documenting periods of his life:

- Tales of a New England Boyhood: Scituate, Massachusetts 1931-1946 (2006)
- Pathway to a Professorship: College and University Life 1946-1955 (2014)
- Living the American Dream: Military Service and Family Life 1955-1969 (2019 - posthumously)

Hattin also wrote a biography of New England painter William Ferdinand Macy:

- W. Ferdinand Macy (1852-1901): Painter of New England Landscapes: A Chronicle of His Life, His Family, and His Artistic Legacy (2004)
