= Pakowki Formation =

- Stratigraphic range: Campanian
- Type: Geological formation
- Underlies: Foremost Formation, Judith River Formation
- Overlies: Milk River Formation
- Thickness: up to 200 metres (660 ft)

Lithology
- Primary: Shale
- Other: Siltstone, sandstone

Location
- Coordinates: 49.19251°N 111.06669°W
- Region: WCSB
- Country: Canada

Type section
- Named for: Pakowki Lake
- Named by: D.B. Dowling, 1916

The Pakowki Formation is a stratigraphic unit of Campanian age in the Western Canadian Sedimentary Basin.

It takes the name from Pakowki Lake, and was first described in outcrop along the Pakowki Coulee by D.B. Dowling in 1916.

== Lithology ==
The Formation is composed of grey mudstone. Olive siltstone and very fine grained sandstone can occur locally. A thin pebble conglomerate marks the base.

== Distribution ==
The Pakowki Formation reaches a maximum thickness of 200 metres (660 ft) in central Saskatchewan. It reaches into southern Alberta, thinning out as it progresses westwards towards the Canadian Rockies foothills.

== Relationship to other units ==
The Pakowki Formation is abruptly overlain by the Milk River Formation and gradationally overlays the Judith River Formation or Foremost Formation.

It is equivalent to the upper part of the Lea Park Formation in central Alberta. It is not differentiated from the Riding Mountain Formation to the east into eastern Saskatchewan and Manitoba.
