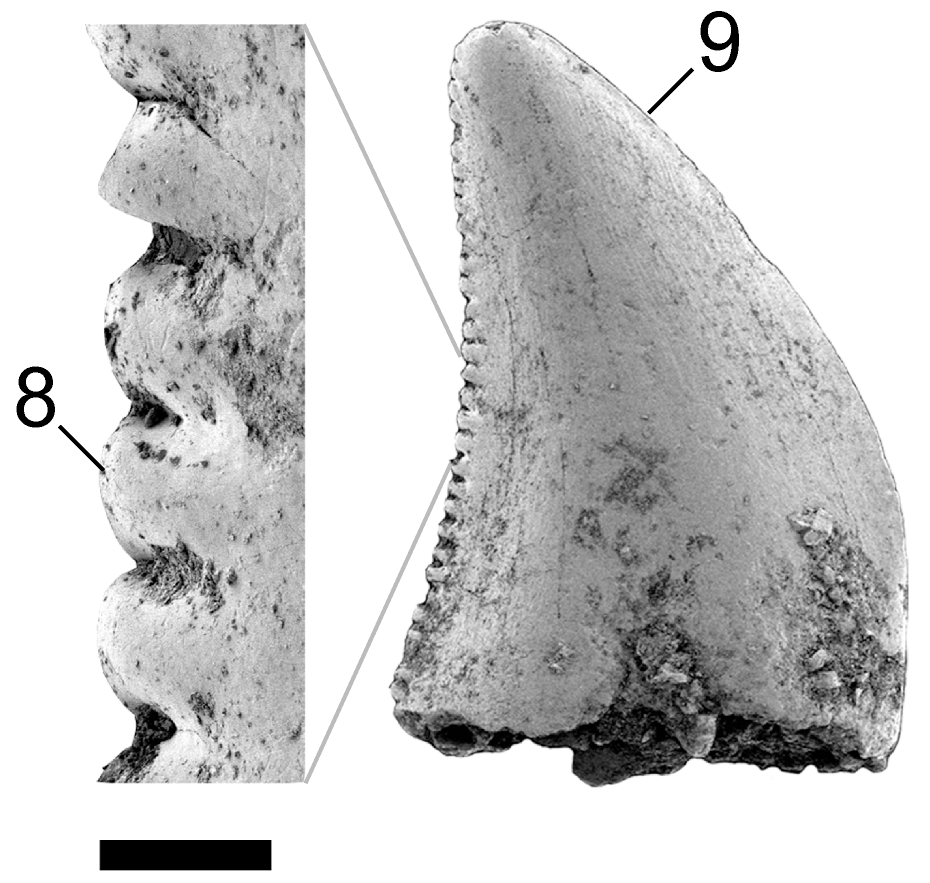
- Tooth of cf. R. gilmorei with close up of denticles

Scientific classification
- Kingdom: Animalia
- Phylum: Chordata
- Class: Reptilia
- Clade: Dinosauria
- Clade: Saurischia
- Clade: Theropoda
- Clade: Coelurosauria
- Genus: †Richardoestesia; Currie, Rigby & Sloan, 1990

Type species
- †Richardoestesia gilmorei Currie, Rigby & Sloan, 1990

Other species
- †R. isosceles Sankey, 2001; †R. asiatica? Averianov & Sues, 2013

Synonyms
- Asiamericana? Nesov, 1995; Ricardoestesia Currie, Rigby & Sloan, 1990

= Richardoestesia =

Richardoestesia Temporal range: Late Cretaceous, 90–66 Ma Possible Early Cretaceous (Barremian) records from teeth of the Cedar Mountain Formation, but see.

Extinct genus of dinosaurs

Richardoestesia is a morphogenus of theropod dinosaur teeth, originally described from the Late Cretaceous of what is now Canada, the United States, and possibly also Uzbekistan. It currently contains two species, R. gilmorei and R. isosceles, and a possible third, R. asiatica, although it has been classified in its own genus Asiamericana. It has been used as a morphotaxon to describe other theropod teeth widely displaced in time and space from the type species. If all teeth assigned to the genus are truly reflective of the animals biology and taxonomic state (as some teeth go as far back as the Late Jurassic), it would have been one of the longest lasting dinosaur genera, perhaps also being the most widely distributed.

== History ==
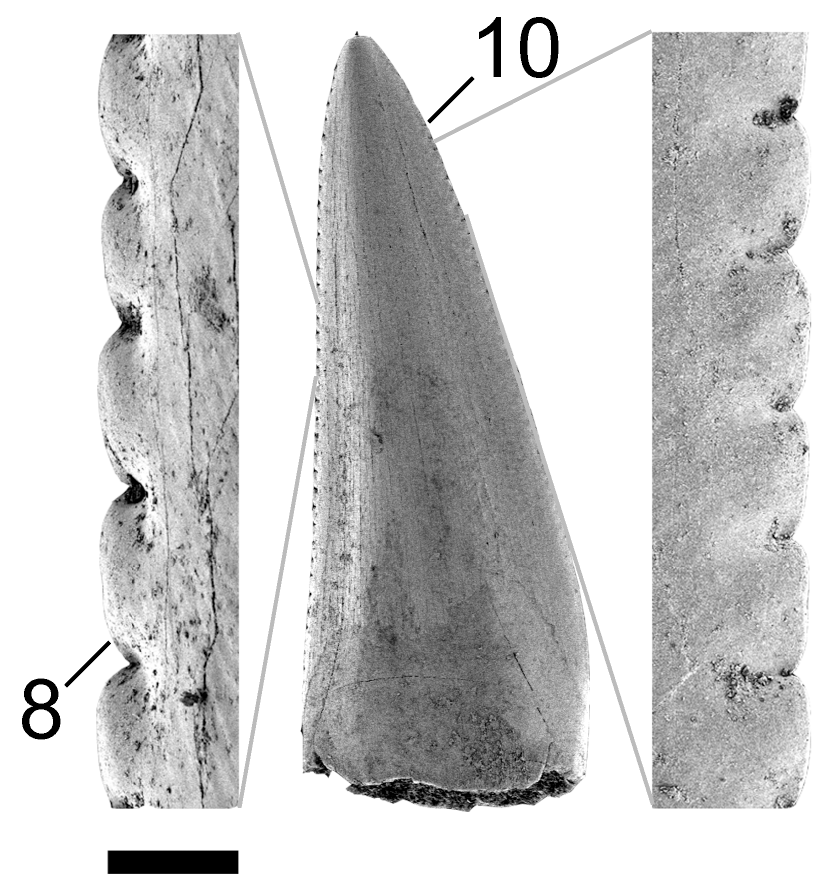
Tooth of cf. R. isosceles with close up of denticles

The jaws were found in 1917 by Charles Hazelius Sternberg and sons in the Dinosaur Provincial Park in Alberta at the Little Sandhill Creek site. In 1924 Charles Whitney Gilmore named Chirostenotes pergracilis and referred the jaws to this species. In the 1980s it became clear that Chirostenotes was an oviraptorosaur to which the long jaws could not have belonged. Therefore, in 1990 Phillip Currie, John Keith Rigby and Robert Evan Sloan named a separate species: Richardoestesia gilmorei.

The genus is named for Richard Estes, to honor his important work on small vertebrates and especially theropod teeth of the Late Cretaceous. The naming authors actually intended to use the spelling Ricardoestesia, Ricardus being the normal latinisation of "Richard". However, except in one overlooked figure caption, the editors of the paper altered the spelling to include the 'h'. Ironically, in 1991 George Olshevsky in a species list also used the spelling Richardoestesia, and indicated Ricardoestesia to be the misspelling, unaware that the original authors actually intended the name to be spelled this way. As a result, under ICZN rules, he acted as "first revisor" choosing between the two spelling variants of the original publication and inadvertently made the misspelt name official. Subsequently, the original authors have adopted the spelling Richardoestesia. The specific name honors Gilmore.

=== Species ===
The holotype specimen of Richardoestesia gilmorei (NMC 343) consists of a pair of lower jaws found in the upper Judith River Group, dating from the Campanian age, about 75 million years ago. The jaws are slender and rather long, 193 millimeters, but the teeth are small and very finely serrated with five to six denticles per millimeter. The serration density is a distinctive trait of the species.

In 2001, Julia Sankey named a second species: Richardoestesia isosceles, based on a tooth, LSUMGS 489:6238, from the Texan Aguja Formation, which is of a longer and less recurved type. The teeth of R. isosceles have also been identified as crocodyliform in shape, possibly belonging to a sebecosuchian.

In 2013 a study assumed that the teeth of the coelurosaur Asiamericana asiatica, from the CBI-14 site of the Bissekty Formation in Uzbekistan, were identical to those of Richardoestesia isosceles, and renamed the species into Richardoestesia asiatica. A subsequent study confirmed this in 2019. The holotype of R. asiatica is CCMGE 460/12457, and two other teeth (ZIN PH 1110/ 16 and ZIN PH 1129/16) are also known.

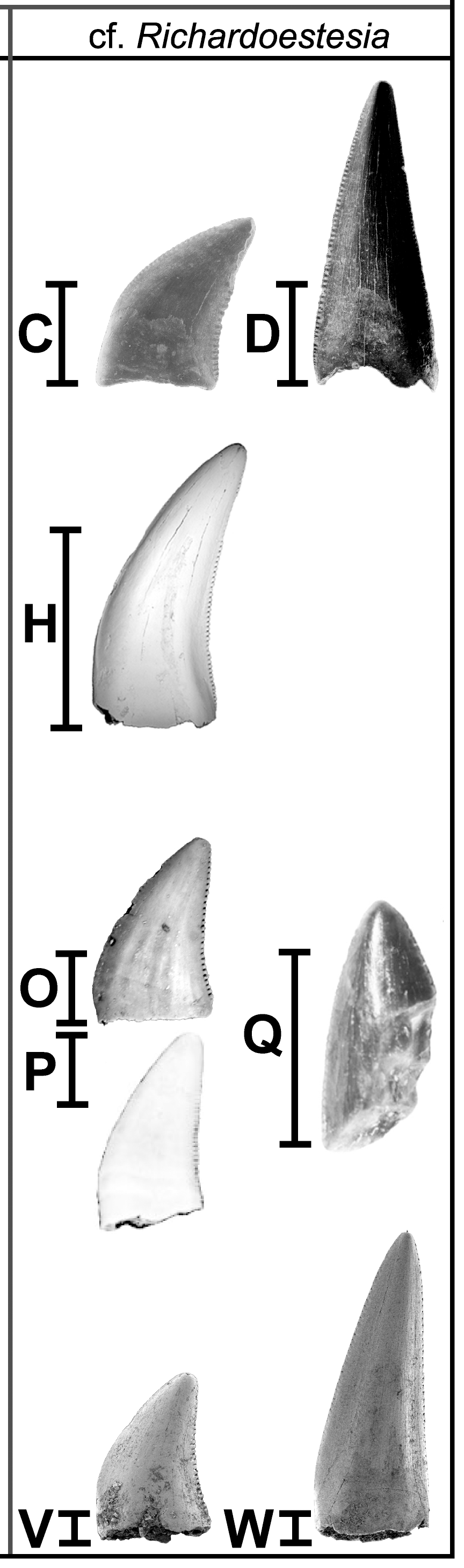
Referred teeth.

== Classification ==
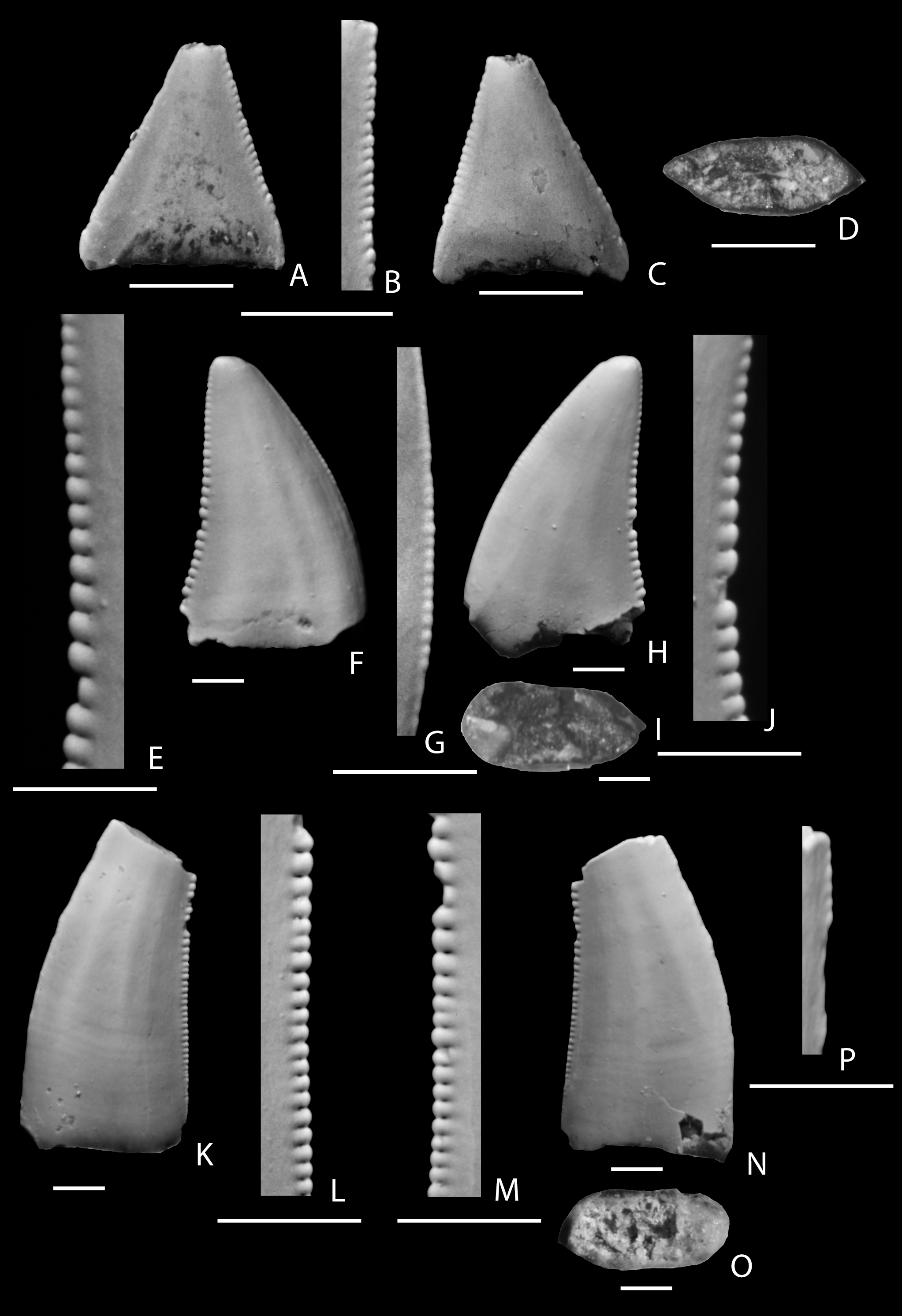
Referred teeth from the San Juan Basin

Richardoestesia-like teeth have been found in many Late Cretaceous geological formations, including the Horseshoe Canyon Formation, the Scollard Formation, Hell Creek Formation, Ferris Formation, and the Lance Formation (dated to about 66 million years ago). Similar teeth have been referred to this genus from as early as the Barremian age (Cedar Mountain Formation, 125 million years ago).

Because of the disparity in location and time of the many referred teeth, researchers have cast doubt on the idea that they all belong to the same genus or species, and the genus is best considered a form taxon. A comparative study of the teeth published in 2013 demonstrated that both R. gilmorei and R. isosceles were only definitively present in the Dinosaur Park Formation, dated to between 76.5 and 75 million years ago. R. isosceles was also present in the Aguja Formation, roughly the same age. All other referred teeth most likely belong to different species, which have not been named due to the lack of body fossils for comparison.

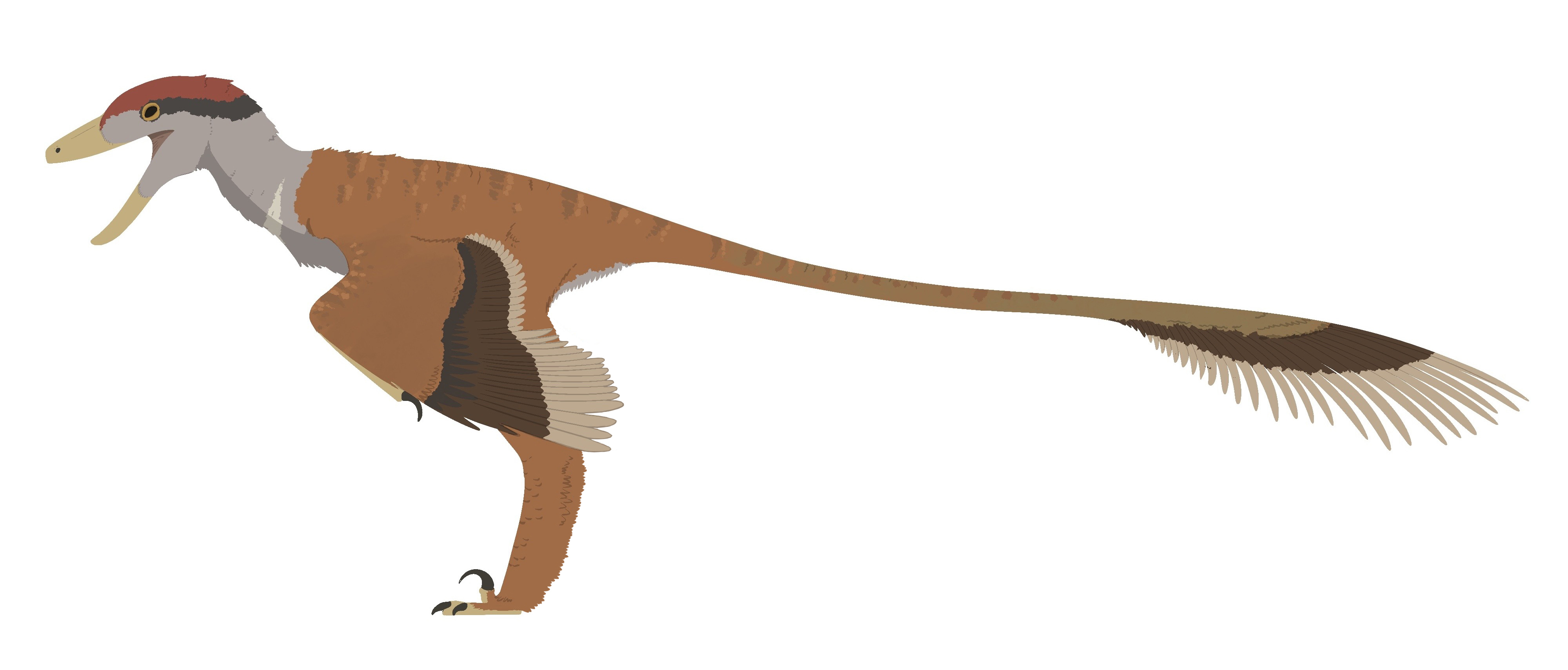
Hypothetical life restoration as a dromaeosaur

Fossils of Richardoestesia have also been found in the Tremp Formation of northeastern Spain (Blasi 2 member). The oldest fossils that have been referred to Richardoestesia come from the Jurassic of Portugal.

== Paleobiology ==
At least a few studies have speculated a piscivorous lifestyle for Richardoestesia, due to its vast distribution as well as predominance in marine sites.
