= Beaver River (Liard River tributary) =

Location
- Country: Canada
- Province: British Columbia
- Territory: Yukon

Physical characteristics
- Source
  - location: Last Mountain
  - coordinates: 60.766°N 126.785°W
  - elevation: 1,350 meters (4,430 ft)
- Mouth
  - location: Liard River
  - coordinates: 59°41′50″N 124°18′00″W
  - elevation: 350 meters (1,150 ft)

The Beaver River is a tributary of the Liard River, entering that stream in the area of its Grand Canyon just south of the British Columbia-Yukon border (the 60th parallel north) after running generally south-east from its origin in the extreme southeast corner of the Yukon Territory.

== Tributaries ==
Tributaries of the Beaver River include, from origin to mouth, the following:

- Pool Creek
- Gold Pay Creek
- Whitefish River
- Larsen Creek
- Saucy Creek
- Crow River

== See also ==
- List of rivers of British Columbia
- List of rivers of Yukon
