= Dunvegan Formation =

Stratigraphical unit in the Western Canadian Sedimentary Basin

- Stratigraphic range: Cenomanian; ~99–94 Ma
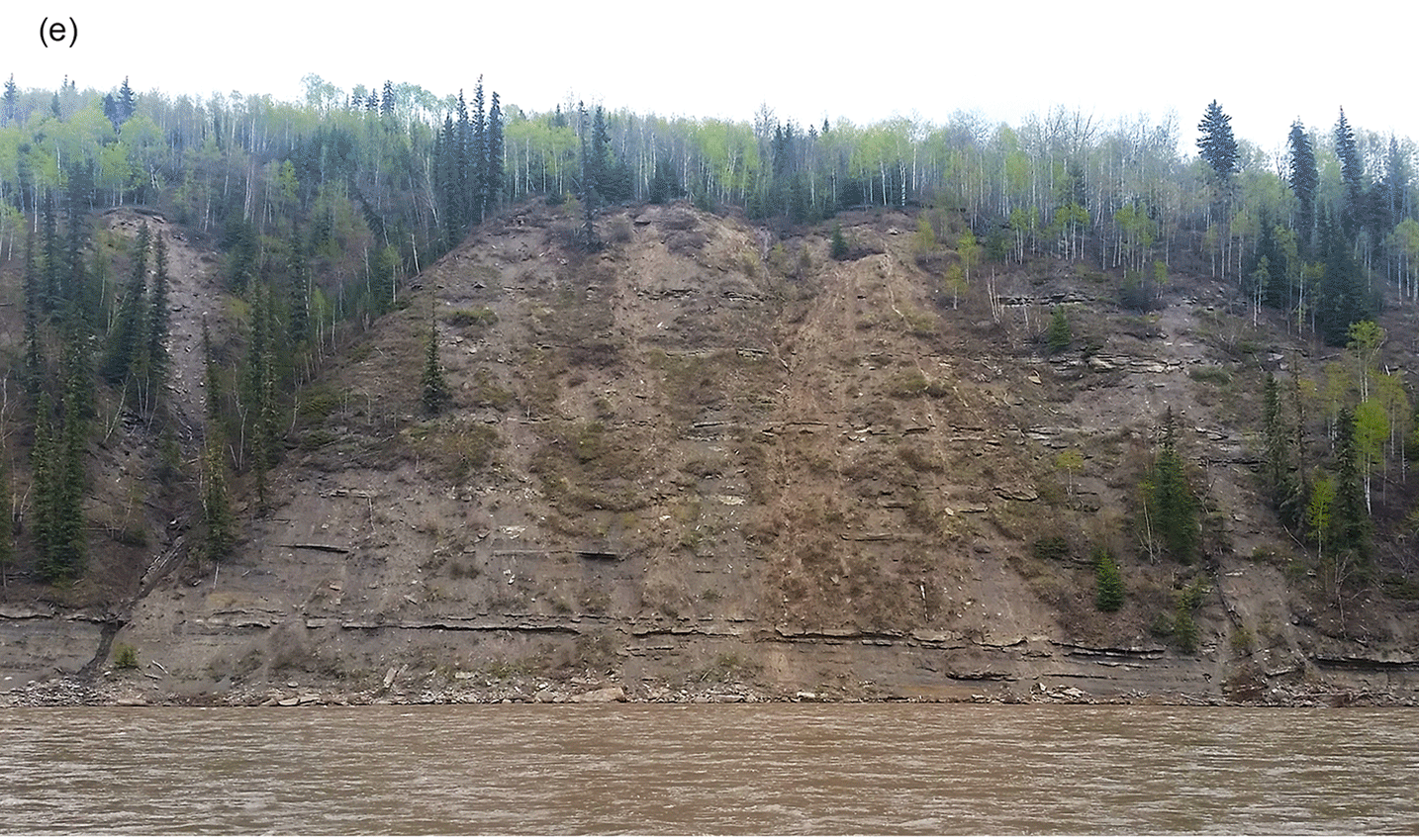
- An outcrop of the Dunvegan Formation along the Pine River, which is the type locality for CMN 59667, an unnamed ankylosaur species.
- Type: Geological formation
- Underlies: Smoky Group
- Overlies: Fort St. John Group (Shaftesbury Formation)
- Thickness: up to 380 feet (120 m)

Lithology
- Primary: Sandstone
- Other: Shale

Location
- Coordinates: 55.92043°N 118.63203°W
- Region: Northeast British Columbia; Northwest Alberta
- Country: Canada

Type section
- Named for: Dunvegan, Alberta
- Named by: George Mercer Dawson
- Year defined: 1881
- Dunvegan Formation (Canada)

The Dunvegan Formation is a stratigraphic unit of Cenomanian age in the Western Canadian Sedimentary Basin.

It takes the name from the settlement of Dunvegan, Alberta, and was first described in an outcrop on Peace River near Dunvegan by George Mercer Dawson in 1881.

== Fossils ==
Nodosaur footprints attributed to Tetrapodosaurus borealis, ornithopod footprints, and theropod footprints attributed to Columbosauripus ungulatus and Ardeipeda sp. are common within the Dunvegan Formation. Dinosaur body fossils are also known from the formation, including:

- Specimen HH 2017.010.002, an ankylosaur femur discovered along the Murray River in 1993 and described in 2024.
- Specimen CMN 59667, a block containing two vertebrae and two ribs from an ankylosaur that was discovered along the Pine River in 1930 and was described in 2020.
- Other ankylosaur remains including osteoderms from Alberta.

Bony fish, sharks, crocodylian footprints, and Metasequoia leaves have also been found in the Dunvegan Formation.

== Lithology ==
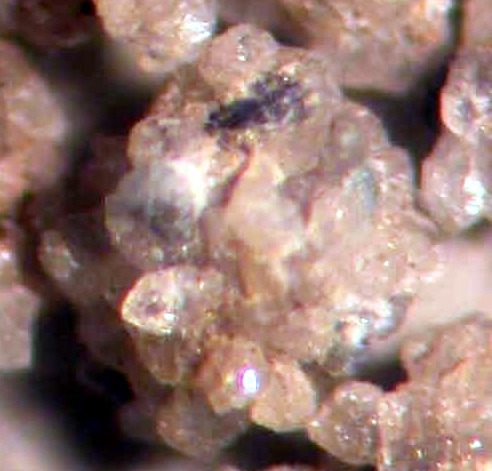
Dunvegan Sandstone

The Dunvegan Formation is composed of marine, and deltaic sandstone with thin shale interbeds in the Peace River Country. East of Dunvegan, Alberta it is of marine origin, and in its western reaches in British Columbia it was deposited in a continental facies, where the sandstone becomes more conglomeratic. During Dunvegan time, a brackish water environment was present in the Wapiti River area and south of Grande Prairie, where the formation is porous.

== Hydrocarbon production ==
The Dunvegan Formation had an initial established recoverable oil reserve of 9.9 million m³, with 3.1 million m³ already produced as of 2008. Gas reserves totaled 18.7 million m³, with 4.5 million m³ already produced.

== Distribution ==
The Dunvegan Formation is 180 feet (50 m) thick in its type locality in Peace River Country and up to 380 feet (120 m) in the sub-surface of the Canadian Rockies foothills. It occurs south of Fort Nelson and the Liard River in north-east British Columbia, thins out south of the Peace River Country. South of the Athabasca River, the Dunvegan grades laterally into the Blackstone Formation.

The Dunvegan Formation is exposed in outcrop along and near the Peace River east of the foothills, in the Peace River Country and the Chinchaga area, as well as patches in north-western Alberta and south of the Caribou Mountains.

== Relationship to other units ==
The Dunvegan Formation is conformably overlain by marine shales of the Kaskapau Formation in the Peace River Country and overlies conformably and transitionally the shale of the Fort St. John Group. The relationship between the Dunvegan and the overlying/underlying units is diachronous and the boundaries of the Dunvegan are placed at the first and last appearances of sandstone within the shale-dominated succession.
