= Alberta Group =

Stratigraphic Group in Alberta, Canada

- Stratigraphic range: Albian to Campanian
- Type: Geological formation
- Sub-units: Wapiabi Formation, Chungo Member, Cardium Formation, Blackstone Formation, Jumping Pound Member
- Underlies: Belly River Formation
- Overlies: Blairmore Group, Luscar Group, Crowsnest Formation
- Thickness: up to 1,219 feet (370 m)

Lithology
- Primary: Shale, sandstone
- Other: Siltstone, siderite, limestone

Location
- Region: Alberta
- Country: Canada

Type section
- Named for: Alberta
- Named by: G.S. Hume, 1930

The Alberta Group is a stratigraphic unit of Cenomanian to early Campanian age in the Lewis overthrust in the Western Canadian Sedimentary Basin.

It takes its name from the province of Alberta, and was first described in outcrops along the Highwood River in southern Alberta by G.S. Hume in 1930.

== Lithology ==
The Alberta Group is composed of silty shale for the most part. Two thick shale deposits (Blackstone Formation and Wapiabi Formation) are present above and below a sandstone sequence (the Cardium Formation). Sideritic concretions and thin argillaceous limestone beds are present within the shale stacks.

=== Oil/gas production ===
Gas is produced from the Cardium Formation in Yellowhead County.

== Distribution ==
The Alberta Group occurs along the Canadian Rockies foothills from the United States-Canada border to the Athabasca River. In its type locality along the Highwood River in Southern Alberta, the group has a thickness of 610 feet (190 m). It reaches a maximum of 1,219 feet (370 m) north of the North Saskatchewan River.

== Relationship to other units ==
The Alberta Group is conformably overlain by the Belly River Formation and rests unconformably on deposits of the Blairmore Group and Luscar Group in the Canadian Rockies foothills and on the volcanic Crowsnest Formation in southern Alberta's west. The group is equivalent with the Colorado Group and Lea Park Formation in southern Alberta's prairies, and with the Smoky Group in northern Alberta and north-east British Columbia.

The Wapiabi Formation is equivalent to the upper Colorado Group shales and Lea Park Formation in central Alberta and the sum of Puskwaskau Formation, Bad Heart Formation and Muskiki Formation in the west part of northern Alberta.

=== Subdivisions ===
The Alberta Group has the following sub-divisions from top to base:

Sub-unit	Age	Lithology	Max thickness	Reference
Wapiabi Formation	Campanian	marine shale, which sideritic concretions, siltstone, sandstone and limestone *contains the Chungo Member sandstone	640 m (2,100 ft)	
Cardium Formation	Turonian to Coniacian	marine sandstone	108 m (350 ft)	
Blackstone Formation	Cenomanian to Turonian	marine shale and siltstone with minor limestone, sandstone and bentonite *contains the Jumping Pound Member sandstone	426 m (1,400 ft)	
