= Suciacarpa =

Suciacarpa Temporal range: Campanian

Scientific classification
- Kingdom: Plantae
- Clade: Tracheophytes
- Clade: Angiosperms
- Clade: Eudicots
- Clade: Asterids
- Order: Cornales
- Family: incertae sedis
- Genus: †Suciacarpa; Atkinson, 2016

Species
- †S. starrii Atkinson, 2016; †S. xiangae Atkinson, Stockey & Rothwell, 2017

Extinct genus of flowering plants

Suciacarpa is an extinct genus of asterid flowering plants in the order Cornales. It is known from the fossil species Suciacarpa starrii and Suciacarpa xiangae, both found in Western North America.

== History and classification ==
Suciacarpa is known from several anatomically preserved fruits found in north-western Washington state, United States, and Vancouver Island, British Columbia.

At time of description the S. starrii holotype specimen, UF 19276-54286, and paratype, UF 19304-54982, were residing in the paleobotanical collections housed by the Florida Museum of Natural History. The two fruits were first studied by Oregon State University paleobotanist Brian Atkinson, with his 2016 type description for the genus and species being published in the NRC Research Press journal Botany. Atkinson coined the genus name Suciacarpa as a combination of "Sucia" after the type locality and the Greek carpa meaning fruit. The specific epithet starrii was chosen as a patronym honoring David W. Starr, who helped collect the fossils and to increase awareness of Sucia Island in the paleontology community.

The fruits show a mosaic combination of features seen in the Cornales family groups Cornaceae/Alangiaceae and Nyssaceae, Mastixiaceae, and Davidiaceae, but does not conform to any one particular family and thus was left as incertae sedis within the order. The Japanese Cornalean species Hironoia fusiformis described from coalified fossils of Coniacian age differ from Suciacarpa in several ways. The holotype fruit has preserved seeds with fungal hyphae and pyrite crystals in the cell structure.

== Distribution and paleoecology ==
The S. starrii holotype specimen was collected on Sucia Island while the paratype was collected on Little Sucia Island. Both fruits are preserved in calcareous nodules recovered from exposures of the Campanian age Cedar District Formation. The nodules formed in what is thought to have been a shallow marine shelf environment that also had ammonites and inoceramid bivalves. The formation has also preserved fossils of other terrestrial organisms including a single land snail, Condonella suciensis and a theropod femur, the first dinosaur identified from Washington State.

The only fossil of S. xiangae was found in a calcareous nodule from an outcrop of the late Campanian Spray Formation, part of the Cretaceous Nanaimo Group. The formation outcrop is in the area of Shelter point on the central eastern coast of Vancouver Island, north of Sucuia and Little Sucia Islands.

There is differing opinion regarding what latitude the formations were deposited at in the Campanian. One suggestion, the Baja–British Columbia hypothesis, is that in the Cretaceous the area was located at about 30° north latitude, similar to Modern Baja California, and subsequent tectonic movement has shifted the area 3,000 km (1,900 mi) north to its present-day location. The other suggestion also involves northward tectonic movement, but suggests the Cretaceous location for the sediments was approximately the region of Northern California.

== Description ==
The S. starrii fruits have a four-chambered structure with a smooth, woody exterior endocarp that is formed from sclerenchyma tissues. The fruits are approximately 8 mm (0.31 in) in diameter and 16 mm (0.63 in) long with each of the four crescent-shaped germination chambers opening near the top of the fruit. The germination chambers have a single seed each, attached to the chamber wall near the apex. Based on the positioning of the preserved fungal hyphae, the cells of the seed integument were rectangular in outline and small. Like members of Nyssaceae, S. starrii has short germination valves that occupy only about half of the fruit, but have secretory chambers, a feature only seen in cornelian cherries of the Cornus subgenus Cornus. Also S. starrii has a pair of vascular bundles running through each of the septa lengthwise. The two bundles converge near the top of the septum to enter the seed.
