= Harrison Lake (disambiguation) =

Harrison Lake is the largest lake in the southern Coast Mountains of British Columbia, Canada.

It may also refer to:

- Harrison Lake (Flathead County, Montana), a lake in Glacier National Park, United States
- Harrison Lake, Indiana, United States, a census-designated place

== See also ==
- Lake Harrison, ancient lake in England
- Harrison Lake State Park, a public recreation area in Ohio
- Harrison Lake Formation, a geologic formation in British Columbia
