= Nanaimo Group =

Geological group in North America

- Stratigraphic range: Cretaceous
- Type: Group

Location
- Region: British Columbia
- Country: Canada

The Nanaimo Group is a geologic group in both British Columbia and Washington state. It preserves fossils dating back to the Cretaceous period.

== Divisions ==
- Gabriola Formation
- Spray Formation
- Geoffroy Formation
- Northumberland Formation
- DeCourcy Formation
- Cedar District Formation
- Protection Formation
- Haslam Formation
- Comox Formation

== See also ==
- List of fossiliferous stratigraphic units in British Columbia
