= Haslam Formation =

Geologic formation in Canada

- Stratigraphic range: Cretaceous
- Type: Formation
- Unit of: Nanaimo Group
- Underlies: Extension Formation
- Overlies: Comox Formation
- Area: SE margin of Vancouver Island and Gulf Islands

Location
- Region: Vancouver Island
- Country: Canada

Type section
- Named for: Haslam Creek

The Haslam Formation is a black shale geologic formation exposed on Vancouver Island and the Gulf Islands, British Columbia, Canada. It preserves primarily marine fossils dating back to the Santonian age of the late Cretaceous period, including specimens of the elasmosaurid plesiosaur Traskasaura sandrae, and three nostoceratid turrilitoids Ainoceras boomerangense and Amapondella separoannulum.

== See also ==
- List of fossiliferous stratigraphic units in British Columbia
