= Cambria Icefield =

Glacier in British Columbia, Canada

Coordinates: 55°48′00″N 129°40′00″W

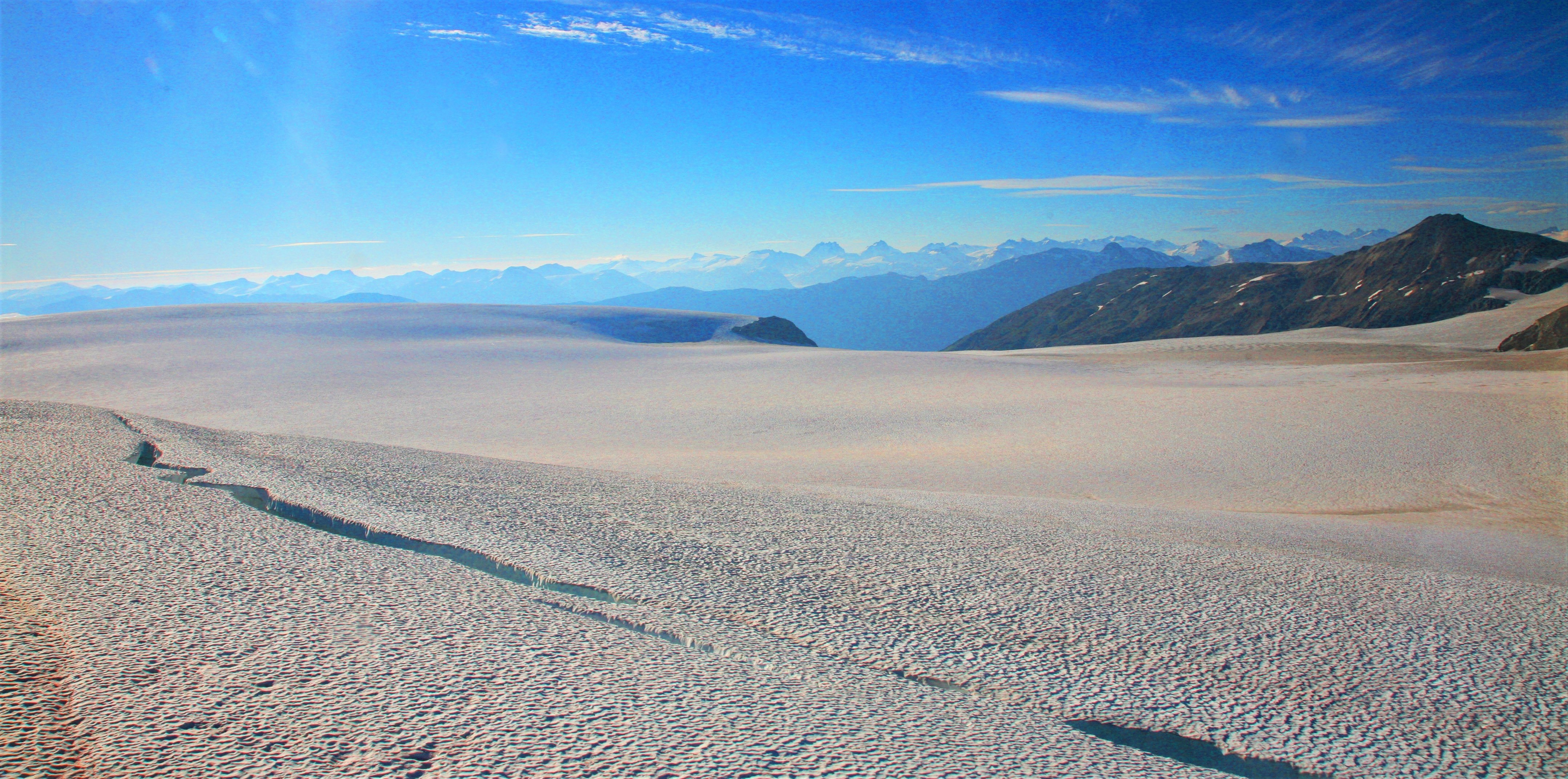
Cambria Icefield

The Cambria Icefield is an icefield in the Boundary Ranges of the Coast Mountains in northwestern British Columbia, Canada, located about 35 km southeast of Stewart. The icefield sits on ancient volcanic rocks from around 190 million years ago and has experienced repeated glacier advances and retreats over the past 2,500 years. Its outlet glaciers, including Bromley Glacier, have been steadily retreating since the early 1900s due to warming temperatures. The region receives heavy precipitation from Pacific weather systems, with most falling as snow during winter months.

== Location and physical setting ==
The Cambria Icefield lies in the Boundary Ranges of north-western British Columbia, roughly 35 km east of the coastal town of Stewart. The icefield occupies a high, granitic backbone and covers about 715 km^{2} (276 sq mi) and feeds several long valley glaciers (Bromley, White, South Flat, Bear River and Todd). At lower elevations the surrounding valleys support mixed subalpine fir and mountain hemlock forest, a sign that the regional climate is wet and cool; long-term observations at Stewart (7 m above sea level) give a mean annual temperature near 6 °C (43 °F) and annual precipitation exceeding 1,840 mm, most of it as winter snow.

== Climate ==
Based on the Köppen climate classification, the Cambria Icefield lies in the subarctic belt of western North America. Most weather fronts originate in the Pacific Ocean and move eastward. When they reach the Coast Mountains they are forced upward by the range (Orographic lift), causing them to drop their moisture in the form of rain or snowfall. As a result, the icefield experiences high precipitation, especially during the winter months in the form of snowfall. Temperatures can drop below −20 °C with wind chill factors below −30 °C.

== Geology ==
The Cambria Icefield rests on tough volcanic rocks of the Early Jurassic Hazelton Group—layers of lava and broken volcanic fragments (volcaniclastic deposits) that erupted along a coastal island arc roughly 190 million years ago. These strata range from dark, magnesium-rich basalts to lighter, silica-rich dacites and rhyolites. Because these rocks erode slowly, the plateau remains high enough to trap snow and build an icefield.

Along the eastern valleys, the volcanic basement (the underlying volcanic 'basement' rock) is capped by softer marine sandstones and mudstones of the Salmon River Formation and Bowser Lake Group (Middle to Late Jurassic). These younger sediments, laid down in a shallow sea fed largely from the west, weather more quickly, giving that side of the icefield gentler, greener slopes.

Structurally, the icefield straddles the boundary between the Intermontane Belt and the Coast Belt of the Canadian Cordillera. It occupies a modest up-warp (structural culmination) bounded by faults such as the Cambria Fault and flanked by two arch-like folds (the Bitter Creek and Cornice Mountain antiforms). This uplift exposes the sturdy Hazelton volcanics while surrounding layers were folded and faulted during later mountain-building episodes.

The same Jurassic magmatic feeder network also fed gold-bearing fluids. On the south-western flank lies the Red Mountain deposit, where veins linked to the 160–200 Ma Goldslide intrusive suite introduced gold and pyrite into the volcanic pile. Fragments of sulphide-rich rock found in nearby debris-flow beds, together with the age of the intrusions, show that mineralisation occurred early—well before the Cretaceous deformation that shaped much of the Skeena Fold Belt.

== Late-Holocene glacial history ==
Repeated advances and retreats during the last 2,500 years have left a clear imprint on the Cambria Icefield's outlet glaciers. A 2013 dendroglaciological study focused on Bromley Glacier—an 821 m above sea level tongue that has already withdrawn 2.5–6 km upslope from its Little Ice Age moraines—reveals four distinct episodes of expansion: roughly 2,500, 1,850, 1,450 and 830 calibrated years before present. These dates come from trees that were overridden and buried in their growth positions; once the ice melted they became exposed in lateral moraines, allowing dendroglaciologists to date the ice advances through ring counts checked against radiocarbon ages.

During the most recent advance (about 830 BP) Bromley Glacier was thick enough to coalesce with ice flowing directly off the plateau surface of the Cambria Icefield, implying a trunk-valley fill close to present tree-line levels. Earlier pulses at about 1,450 BP and about 1,850 BP match the so-called First Millennium Advance recorded all along the Coast Mountains, while the oldest event (about 2,500 BP) lines up with synchronous activity at Todd and Sage glaciers just to the north.

== Modern change ==
Systematic mapping shows that Bromley Glacier has been in steady retreat since at least 1910, losing an average of 86 m (282 ft) of length each year, as much as 213 m (699 ft) annually during the sharp warming of 1936–1955. As the glacier thinned after the 1970s its five tributaries detached, leaving high, rubble-capped lateral moraines that now sit more than 100 m (330 ft) above the current ice surface. Its exposed forefield—bare bedrock, freshly deposited sand and gravel, and sharp-edged moraines—shows how quickly Coast Mountain glaciers respond to sustained melting.

== Gallery ==
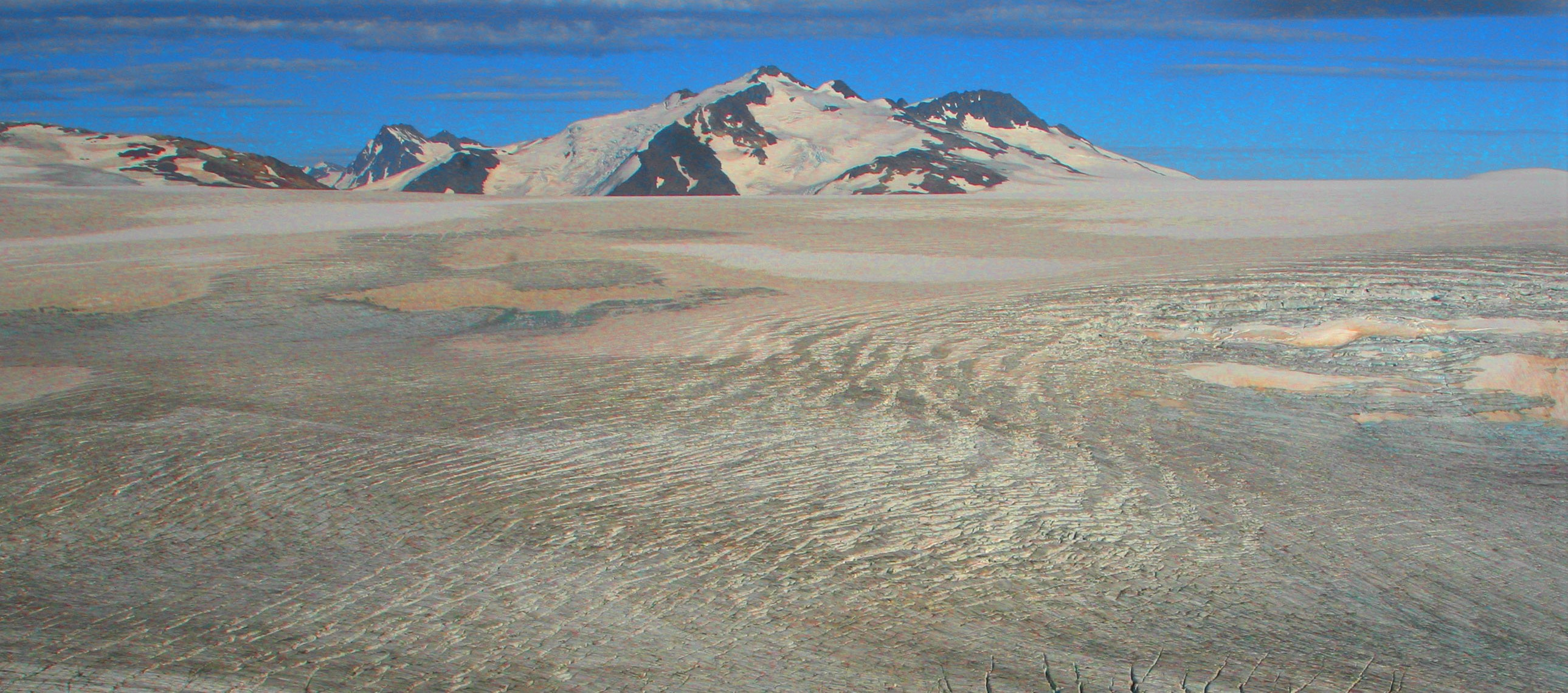
Bromley Peak and Cambria Icefield

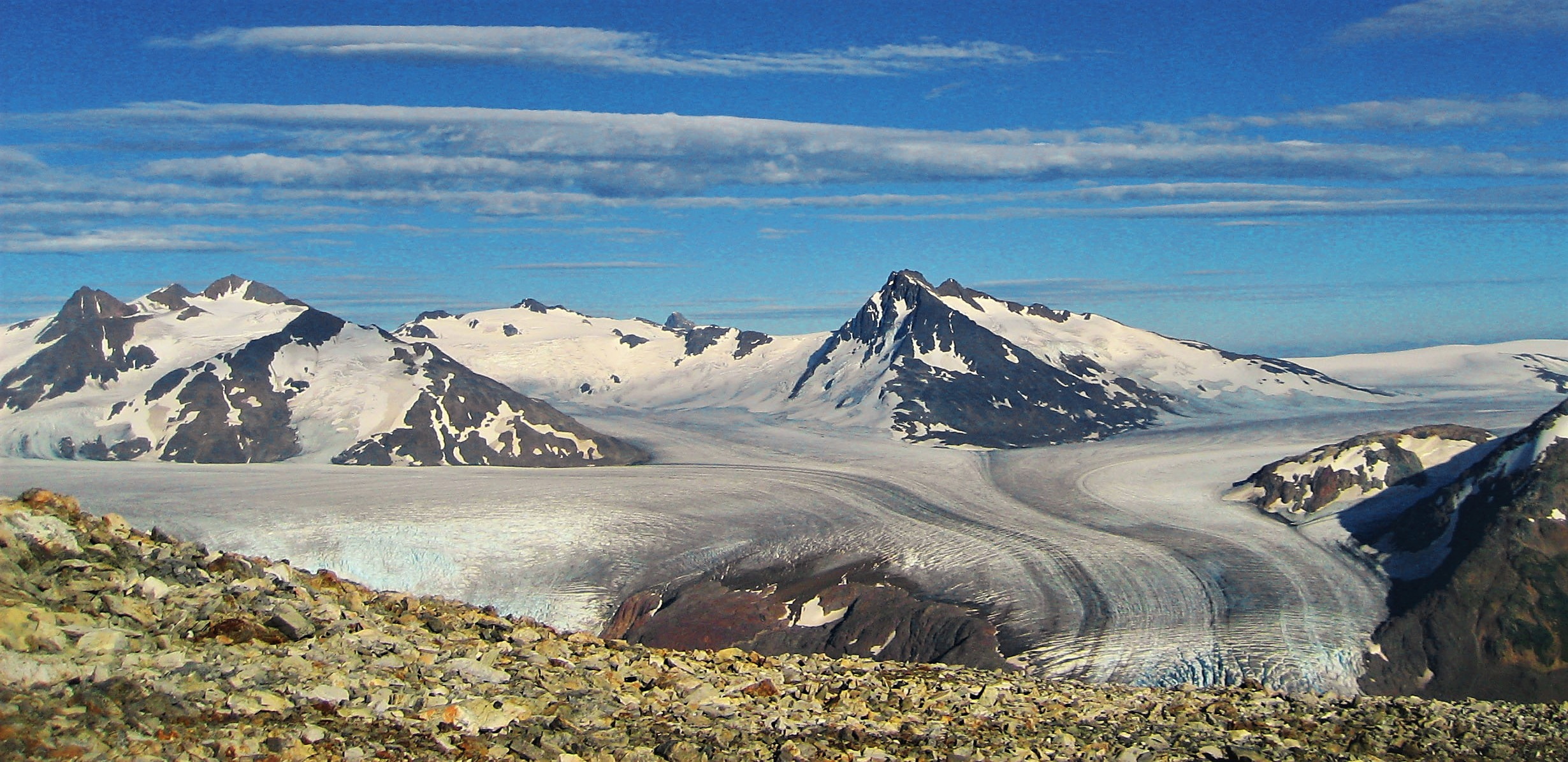
Mount Camber and Cambria Icefield

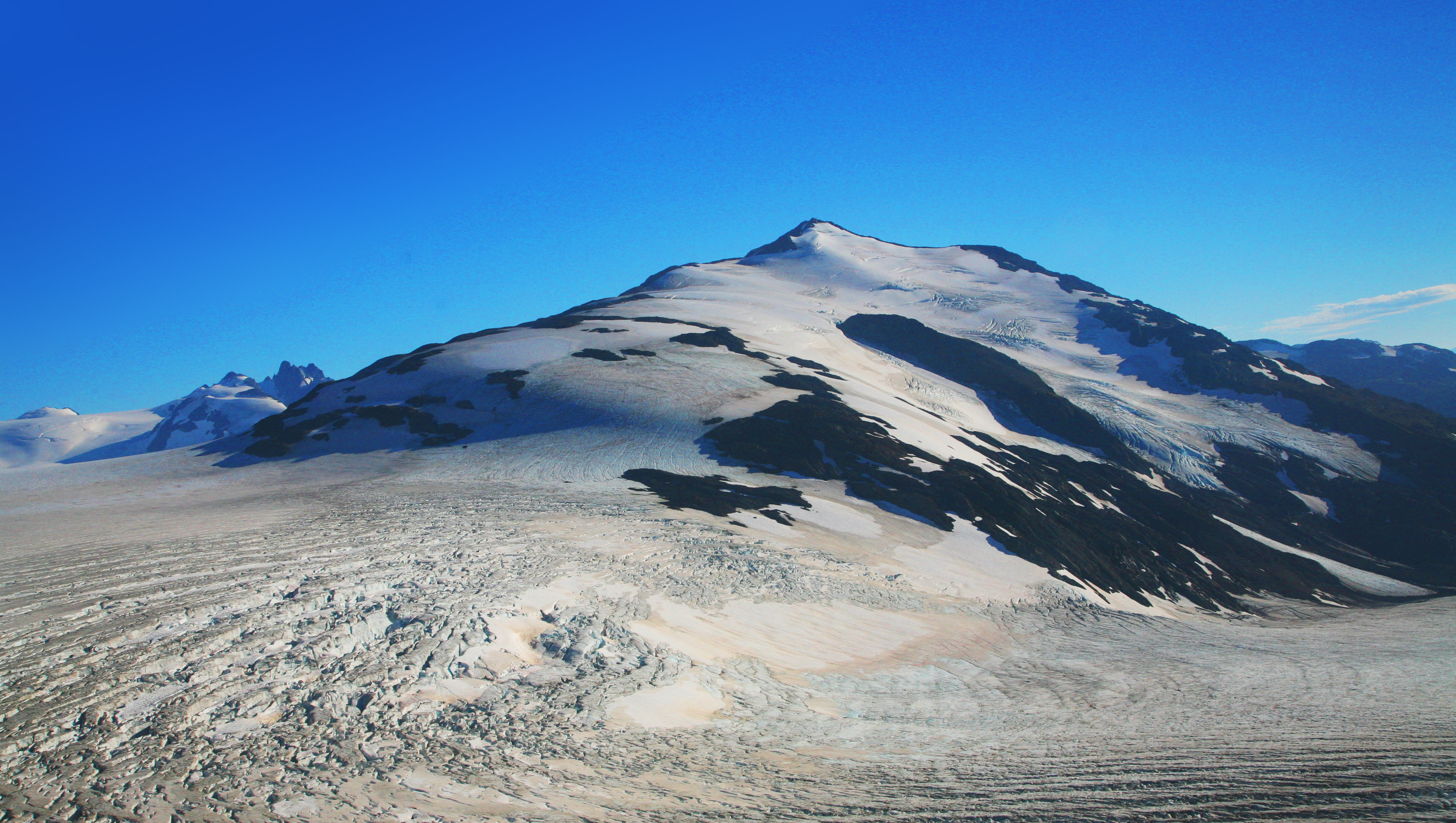
Mount McLeod and Cambria Icefield

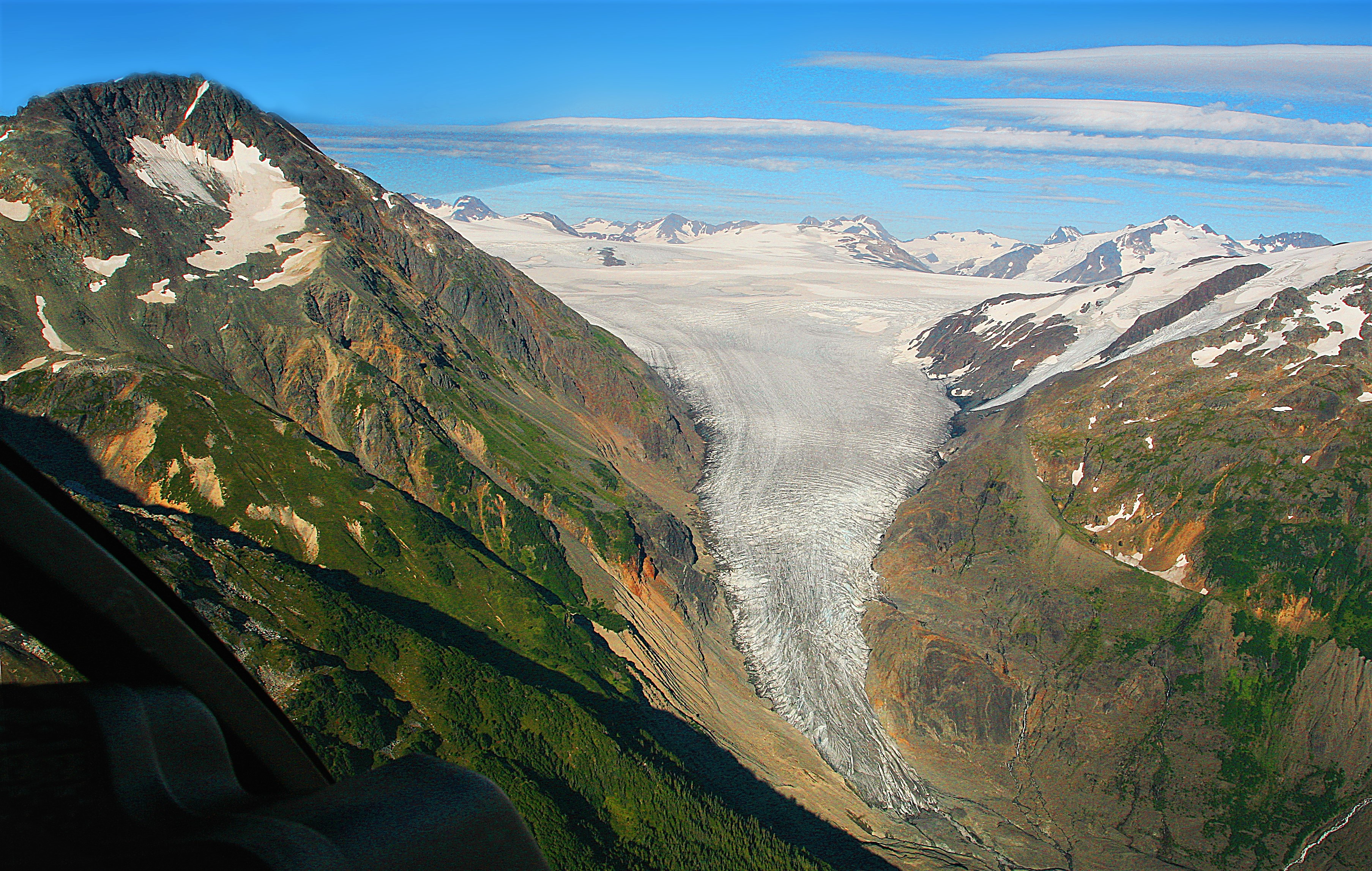
Mt. Magee (left) and glacier descending from Cambria Icefield to Kate Ryan Creek. Mount Camber centered in the distance.

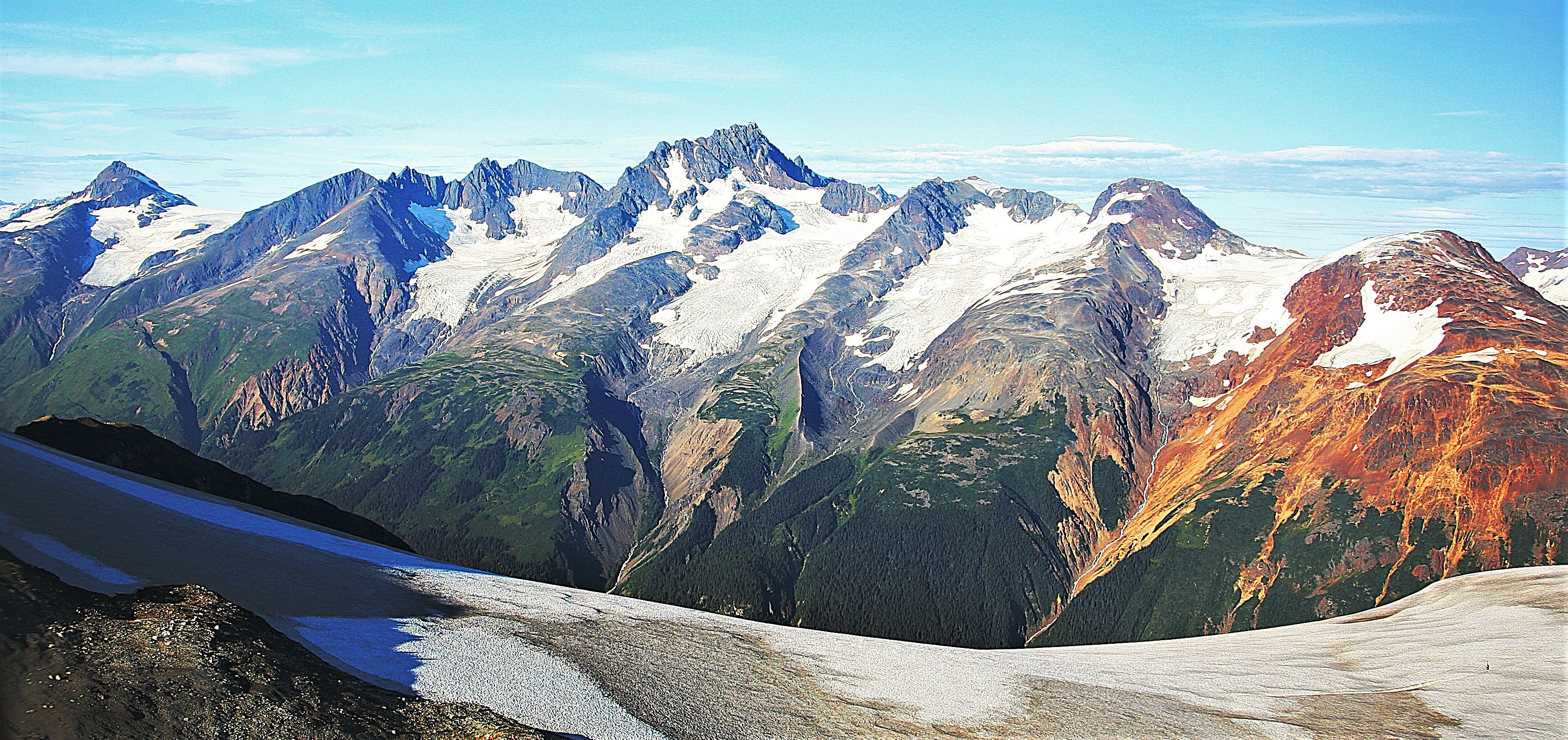
Otter Mountain, the highest peak of the Cambria Icefield area
