= Maude Group =

Geologic group in British Columbia, Canada

- Stratigraphic range: Pliensbachian-Aalenian
- Type: Group
- Sub-units: Fannin, Ghost Creek, Phantom Creek & Whiteaves Formations

Location
- Region: British Columbia
- Country: Canada
- Maude Group (Canada) Maude Group (British Columbia)

The Maude Group is a geologic group in British Columbia, comprising Lower Jurassic sedimentary strata that overlie Upper Triassic units, which are overlain by Middle–Upper Jurassic volcanic sequences.

The group consists predominantly of sedimentary clastic rocks derived from continental sources, and is further subdivided into formations, including shale-dominated intervals and sandstone units reflecting fluctuations in sea level within a progressively evolving basin.

== See also ==
- List of fossiliferous stratigraphic units in British Columbia
