= List of fossiliferous stratigraphic units in British Columbia =

This is a list of fossiliferous stratigraphic units in British Columbia, Canada.

Group or formation	Period	Notes
Advance Formation	Ordovician	
Allenby Formation	Paleogene	
Ambition Formation	Permian	
Ashman Formation	Jurassic	
Asitka Formation	Permian	
Asitka Formation	Permian	
Atan Group/Rosella Formation	Cambrian	
Baldonnel Formation	Triassic	
Bardonnel Formation	Triassic	
Beaver Mines Formation	Early Cretaceous	
Beaverfoot Formation	Silurian, Ordovician	
Belcourt Formation	Permian	
Billhook Formation	Jurassic	
Bocock Group/Pardonet Formation	Triassic	
Bonanza Formation	Jurassic, Triassic	
Boulder Creek Formation	Early Cretaceous	
Bowser Lake Formation	Jurassic	
Brokenback Hill Formation	Cretaceous	
Buckinghorse Formation	Early Cretaceous	
Bullhead Group/Gething Formation	Early Cretaceous	
Bullhead Group/Beattie Peaks Formation	Early Cretaceous	
Bullhead Group/Monach Formation	Early Cretaceous	
Burgess Shale Formation	Cambrian	
Buttle Lake Formation	Permian	
Cache Creek Formation	Permian	
Cache Creek Group/Horsefeed Formation	Permian, Carboniferous	
Cadomin Formation	Early Cretaceous	
Cardium Formation	Late Cretaceous	
Carmanah Formation	Paleogene	
Cathedral Formation	Cambrian	
Chancellor Group/Burgess Shale Formation	Cambrian	
Charlie Lake Formation	Triassic	
Coldwater Beds Formation	Paleogene	
Commotion Formation	Early Cretaceous	
Comox Formation	Cretaceous	
Currier Formation	Jurassic	
Cushina Formation	Ordovician	
Devils Claw Formation	Cretaceous	
Devon Island Formation	Devonian	
Duchesnay Formation	Cambrian	
Dunedin Formation	Devonian	
Dunvegan Formation	Late Cretaceous	
Fannin Formation	Jurassic	
Fantasque Formation	Permian	
Fernie Formation	Jurassic	
Flume Formation	Middle Devonian to Late Devonian	
Fort St. John Group/Buckinghorse Formation	Early Cretaceous	
Fort St. John Group/Shaftesbury Formation	Early Cretaceous	
Fort St. John Group/Sikanni Formation	Early Cretaceous	
Gates Formation	Early Cretaceous	
Ghost Creek Formation	Jurassic	
Glenogle Formation	Ordovician	
Grayling Formation	Triassic	
Grey Beds Formation	Triassic	
Haida Formation	Cretaceous	
Hall Formation	Jurassic	
Harbledown Formation	Jurassic	
Harper Ranch Formation	Permian	
Harrison Lake Formation	Jurassic	
Haslam Formation	Cretaceous	
Hazelton Formation	Cretaceous, Jurassic	
Hazelton Group/Cold Fish Volcanics Formation	Jurassic	
Hazelton Group/Lower Limestone Formation	Jurassic	
Hazelton Group/Lower Volcanics Formation	Jurassic	
Hazelton Group/Nilkitkwa Formation	Jurassic	
Hazelton Group/Smithers Formation	Jurassic	
Hazelton Group/Spatsizi Formation	Jurassic	
Hazelton Formation	Jurassic	
Honna Formation	Cretaceous	
Hazelton Group/Smithers Formation	Jurassic	
Hulcross Formation	Early Cretaceous	
Ishbel Formation	Permian	
Jackass Mountain Formation	Cretaceous	
Kakisa Formation	Devonian	
Kamloops Formation	Paleogene	
Karmutsen Formation	Triassic	
Kaskapau Formation	Late Cretaceous	
Kechika Formation	Ordovician	
Keg River Formation	Middle Devonian	
Kindle Formation	Permian	
King Salmon Formation	Triassic	
Kingsvale Formation	Cretaceous	
Kishenehn Formation	Paleogene	
Kootenay Group	latest Jurassic to earliestCretaceous	
Kunga Group/Peril Formation	Triassic	
Kunga Group/Sandilands Formation	Jurassic, Triassic	
Laberge Formation	Jurassic	
Laberge Group/Takwahoni Formation	Jurassic	
Laird Formation	Triassic	
Last Creek Formation	Jurassic	
Lepine Formation	Cretaceous	
Liard Formation	Triassic	
Ludington Formation	Triassic	
Marble Canyon Formation	Permian	
Maude Group	Jurassic	
Maude Group/Fannin Formation	Jurassic	
Maude Group/Ghost Creek Formation	Jurassic	
Maude Group/Phantom Creek Formation	Jurassic	
Maude Group/Whiteaves Formation	Jurassic	
McEvoy Formation	Cretaceous	
McGregor Creek Formation	Permian	
McKay Group	Ordovician, Cambrian	
McKay Group/E Formation	Ordovician	
McKay Group/Unit H Formation	Cambrian	
Miette Group	Ediacaran	
Miette Group/Byng Formation	Ediacaran	
Minnes Group	Early Cretaceous	
Mist Mountain Formation	latest Jurassic to earliest Cretaceous	
Monteith Formation	Early Cretaceous	
Moosebar Formation	Early Cretaceous	
Mount Greene Formation	Permian	
Mount Hawk Formation	Late Devonian	
Mount Mark Formation	Permian	
Mount Whyte Formation	Cambrian	
Mural Formation	Cambrian	
Mural (Tah) Formation	Cambrian	
Nanaimo Group	Cretaceous	
Nanaimo Group/Cedar District Formation	Cretaceous	
Nanaimo Group/Comox Formation	Cretaceous	
Nanaimo Group/Extension Formation	Cretaceous	
Nanaimo Group/Newcastle Formation	Cretaceous	
Nanaimo Group/Northumberland Formation	Cretaceous	
Nanaimo Group/Protection Formation	Cretaceous	
Nanaimo Group/Spray Formation	Cretaceous	
Nicola Formation	Triassic	
Northumberland Formation	Cretaceous	
Ootsa Lake Formation	Paleogene	
Open Bay Formation	Triassic	
Opuntia Formation	Jurassic	
Pardonet Formation	Triassic	
Pardonet Group/Baldonnel Formation	Triassic	
Parsons Bay Formation	Triassic	
Pasayten Formation	Cretaceous	
Pender Formation	Cretaceous	
Peril Formation	Triassic	
Phantom Creek Formation	Jurassic	
Princeton Group	Paleogene	
Princeton Group/Allenby Formation	Paleogene	
Ptarmigan Formation	Cambrian	
Quatsino Formation	Triassic	
Ranger Canyon Formation	Permian	
Road River Formation	Silurian	
Rocky Mountain Group/Ishbel Formation	Permian	
Rocky Mountain Group/Tunnel Mountain Formation	Carboniferous	
Rosella Formation	Cambrian	
Ross Creek Formation	Permian	
Sadler Formation	Triassic	
Salmon River Formation	Jurassic	
Sandilands Formation	Jurassic, Triassic	
Schooler Creek Group/Pardonet Formation	Triassic	
Second White Speckled Shale Formation	Late Cretaceous	
Simla Formation	Devonian	
Sinwa Formation	Triassic	
Skidgate Formation	Cretaceous	
Skoki Formation	Ordovician	
Skonun Formation	Neogene	
Slave Point Formation	Middle Devonian	
Slocan Formation	Triassic	
Smithers Formation	Jurassic	
Smoky Group/Kaskapau Formation	Late Cretaceous	
Sooke Formation	Paleogene	
Spence Bridge Formation	Cretaceous	
Spray River Formation	Triassic	
Stephen Formation	Cambrian	
Stuhini Formation	Triassic	
Sulphur Mountain Formation	Triassic	
Sulphur Point Formation	Devonian	
Sustut Group/Brothers Peak Formation	Cretaceous	
Sutton Formation	Triassic	
Takla Formation	Triassic	
Telford Formation	Permian	
Telkwa Formation	Jurassic	
Toad Formation	Triassic	
Transitional Beds Formation	Triassic	
Tyaughton Formation	Triassic	
Uslika Formation	Cretaceous	
Vermilion Formation	Cambrian	
Whiteaves Formation	Jurassic	
Yakoun Formation	Jurassic	
Yakoun Group/Graham Island Formation	Jurassic	
