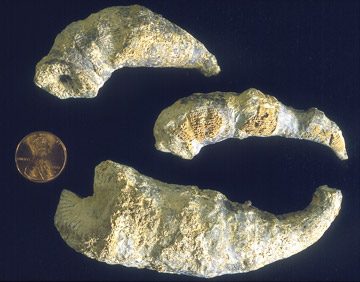
- Caninia torquia from the Beil Limestone Member, Lecompton Limestone, Douglas County, Kansas

Scientific classification
- Domain: Eukaryota
- Kingdom: Animalia
- Phylum: Cnidaria
- Subphylum: Anthozoa
- Class: †Rugosa
- Family: †Cyathopsidae
- Genus: †Caninia; Michelin 1840

= Caninia (coral) =

Caninia Temporal range: Devonian to Permian 419.2–252.2 Ma

Extinct genus of corals

Caninia is an extinct genus of rugose coral. Its fossils occur worldwide from the Devonian to the Permian periods.

== Paleoecology ==
It was marine in nature and known to live in lagoon-type ecosystems. Because of the shallow water in which it lived, Caninia was often affected by processes above the water level, such as storms.

== Distribution ==
Place name	formation	Age
"Worldwide"		Devonian
Arkansas	Fayetteville Shale, Pitkin Limestone	Mississippian
Illinois		Mississippian
Oklahoma	Fayetteville Shale	Mississippian
Montana	Otter Formation	Mississippian
New Mexico	Lake Valley Formation	Mississippian
Kansas	Lecompton Limestone	Pennsylvanian
Nevada (Ely basin)	Chainman Shale	(Early) Pennsylvanian
Texas	Cisco Group	Pennsylvanian
Wales (South)	Arundian Limestone, High Tor Limestone	Carboniferous
Vancouver Island	Buttle Lake Formation	Permian
