= Condonella =

Condonella Temporal range: Campanian

Scientific classification
- Domain: Eukaryota
- Kingdom: Animalia
- Phylum: Mollusca
- Class: Gastropoda
- Order: Stylommatophora
- Family: Eucalodiidae
- Genus: †Condonella; McLellan, 1927
- Species: †C. suciensis

Binomial name
- †Condonella suciensis McLellan, 1927

Extinct genus of gastropods

Condonella is an extinct genus of land snail in the family Urocoptidae known from the fossil species Condonella suciensis of Western North America.

== History and classification ==
C. suciensis is known from a single internal mold fossil found in north-western Washington state. The holotype specimen was collected on Sucia Island from the south side of Fossil Bay in a group of rock described as "Haslam fossiliferous shale". The area was stated by Roy Davidson McLellan to be fossil rich and Ward in 1978 assigned the strata to the Campanian age Cedar District Formation. The strata preserve what is thought to have been a shallow marine shelf environment that also had ammonites and inoceramid bivalves. The formation has also preserved fossils of other terrestrial organisms including a basal cornalean flowering plant, Suciacarpa starrii and a theropod femur, the first dinosaur identified from Washington State. There is differing opinion regarding what latitude the Cedar district Formation sediments were deposited at in the Campanian. One suggestion, the Baja—British Columbia hypothesis, is that in the Cretaceous the area was located at about 30° north latitude, similar to Modern Baja California, and subsequent tectonic movement has shifted the area 3,000 km (1,900 mi) north to its present-day location. The other suggestion also involves northward tectonic movement, but suggests the Cretaceous location for the sediments was approximately the region of Northern California.

C. suciensis was first described by McLellan in his 1927 Geology of the San Juan Islands based on the single fossil recovered during field work for his thesis. The genus name Condonella was chosen to honor Herbert T. Condon, then the comptroller of the University of Washington, while no etymology was given for the species name suciensis. McLellan noted that the fossil had been examined by paleontologists Timothy William Stanton and William Healey Dall, who both mentioned the shell was similar to those of genus Planorbis freshwater snails. He did not feel that it was likely to be related to Planorbis based on its preservation in marine sediments however, and did not place it into any specific gastropod order. The holotype fossil was reexamined in 1999 by Barry Roth of the University of California, who noted the shell thickness and uniform nature is similar to many non-marine pulmonate gastropods. The fine sculpturing on the exterior of the shell, along with the tight coiling of the shell whorl is most similar to modern members of the land snail family Urocoptidae, and most particularly Eucalodiinae genera, which Roth called "Eucalodiidae".

== Description ==
The holotype fossil has a flat to low spired shell with 6.25 whorls preserved and a diameter of 13.7 mm (0.54 in), though the adult whorls are not preserved. The spire is low, with the outer whorls being higher than the inner whorls, giving a sunken look to the shell center. Numerous fine suture lines curve across most of the shell, fading as the lines approach the keel. Each of the suture lines curve outward toward the aperture.
