= Ambition (disambiguation) =

Ambition is a character trait that describes people in pursuit of lofty goals.

Ambition, Ambitions or Ambitious may also refer to:

== Music ==
=== Albums ===
- Ambitions (album), a 2017 album by One Ok Rock
- Ambition (Tommy Shaw album), 2014
- Ambition (Wale album), 2011, or the title song

=== Songs ===
- "Ambition" (Miz song), 1999 J-pop song and album
- "Ambition" (Pepper song), 2008 reggae song
- "Ambition", a song by Band-Maid from the 2021 album Unseen World
- "Ambitions" (song), 2009 song by Norwegian band Donkeyboy
- "Ambitious! Yashinteki de Ii Jan", 2006 song by Japanese band Morning Musume

== Film and television ==
- Ambition (1916 film), a lost silent film drama directed by James Vincent
- Ambition (1939 film), a 1939 Argentine film directed by Adelqui Migliar
- Ambition (1991 film), a 1991 American thriller film
- Ambition (TV series), Hong Kong series around 1992
- Ambitions (TV series), a 2019 series on the Oprah Winfrey Network
- Ambition, a 2019 American thriller film directed by Robert Shaye

== Institutions ==
- Ambition (charity), a British youth charity
- Ambition Institute of Technology in Varanasi, India

== Literature ==
- Ambition (novel), a 1989 novel by Julie Burchill
- Ambition (play), a 1895 play by Henry Guy Carleton

== Other uses ==
- The Sims 3: Ambitions, expansion pack for The Sims 3 video game
- Ambition (fragrance), a women's fragrance created by Jordin Sparks
- Ambition Formation, a geologic formation in British Columbia, Canada
- MS Ambition, cruise ship launched in 1999
