= Glenogle Formation =

- Stratigraphic range: Ordovician; ~472–452 Ma
- Type: Formation
- Underlies: Mount Wilson Formation
- Overlies: McKay Group
- Thickness: Up to about 750 m (2460 feet)

Lithology
- Primary: Shale
- Other: Siltstone, sandstone

Location
- Coordinates: 51°17′00″N 116°49′00″W
- Region: British Columbia
- Country: Canada

Type section
- Named for: Glenogle Creek, British Columbia
- Named by: L.D. Burling, 1922

The Glenogle Formation or Glenogle Shale is a stratigraphic unit of Ordovician (Arenigian to early Caradocian) age. It is present on the western edge of the Western Canada Sedimentary Basin in southeastern British Columbia. It consists primarily of black shale and was named for Glenogle Creek in the Kicking Horse River area by L.D. Burling in 1923.

The formation is known for its fossil graptolites.

== Lithology and thickness ==
The Glenogle Formation was deposited in an oxygen-deficient marine environment and consists of black, fissile shale with thin beds and laminations of siltstone and sandstone in the upper part. It has a maximum thickness of about 750 m (2460 feet).

== Distribution and relationship to other units ==
The Glenogle Formation is present in the Kootenay Ranges of southeastern British Columbia and is not known to be present west of the Columbia River. It rests conformably on the McKay Group and is overlain, probably disconformably, by the Mount Wilson Formation. It is equivalent to the Owen Creek and Skoki Formations and the upper part of the Outram Formation in the eastern main ranges of the Canadian Rockies, and the upper part of the McKay Group in some parts of the western main ranges.

== Paleontology and age ==
The shales of the Glenogle Formation are known for their fossil graptolites such as Didymograptus. Their age range of Arenigian to early Caradocian has been determined from graptolite index fossils.
