= Toad River Formation =

Geologic formation in British Columbia, Canada

- Stratigraphic range: Triassic
- Type: Formation

Location
- Region: British Columbia
- Country: Canada

The Toad River Formation is a geologic formation located in northeastern British Columbia. It preserves fossils dating back to the Triassic period.

The fossil diversity of the formation is low in the deeper distal shelf of the formation, but moderate to high in the medium depth offshore transition. Most fossils in the formation are trace fossils rather than complete fossils.

== See also ==
- List of fossiliferous stratigraphic units in British Columbia
