= Bullhead Mountain Group =

Geologic group in British Columbia, Canada

- Stratigraphic range: Cretaceous
- Type: Group

Location
- Region: British Columbia
- Country: Canada

The Bullhead Mountain Group is a geologic group in British Columbia. It preserves fossils dating back to the Cretaceous period.

== See also ==
- List of fossiliferous stratigraphic units in British Columbia
