= Kunga =

Kunga may refer to:

- Kunga, a common Tibetan name
- Kunga (equid), a Bronze Age hybrid of the donkey and Syrian wild ass
- Kunga cake, an East African food made of midges or flies
- Lagos Kunga, an American soccer player
- The Kunga Group, a geologic group in British Columbia
- The Kunga River, a continuation of the Pasur River in Bangladesh
