= Devil's claw =

Devil's claw may refer to:

== Plants ==
- Harpagophytum species, native to Southern Africa and a herbal medicine
- some Pisonia species are known as "devil's-claws"
- Proboscidea species native to the southwestern United States and Mexico which produce a characteristic hooked seed pod.
- Senegalia greggii, a tree native to North America
- Martynia, a plant native to the desert regions of North America

== Other ==
- Devil's claw (nautical), a metal hook for grabbing a ship's anchor chain
- The Devils Claw Formation, a geologic formation in British Columbia, Canada
- Devils Claw Mountain, a mountain in the Skeena Mountains in Canada
