= Nang Xaldangaas Conservancy =

Protected area in British Columbia, Canada

- Nang Xaldangaas Heritage Site/Conservancy
- Nang Xaldangaas Conservancy on Haida Gwaii in British Columbia
- Location: Pacific Ocean
- Coordinates: 54°05′07″N 132°14′33″W
- Area: 16,695 ha (64.46 sq mi)
- Established: December 17, 2008
- Governing body: Council of the Haida Nation and BC Parks

Nang Xaldangaas Conservancy, also known as Nang Xaldangaas Heritage Site/Conservancy, is a protected coastal and marine area on the northern coast of Graham Island in the Haida Gwaii archipelago in British Columbia, Canada. Established in 2008, it encompasses 16,695 hectares (41,254 acres), consisting of 6,897 hectares of terrestrial habitat and 9,798 hectares of marine foreshore. The area is protected by the Council of the Haida Nation, as a Haida Heritage Site, and by the Province of British Columbia, as a conservancy.

The conservancy protects coastal forests, wetlands, estuaries, and marine ecosystems, including important habitat for waterfowl and shorebirds. It also contains numerous archaeological sites associated with the long history of Haida settlement and use of the area.

== History ==
=== Ancient history ===
Haida oral tradition associates the area with supernatural beings and stories of gifts of an abundance of natural resources. One noted account concerns a young woman from Tuuhlga village west of Yaan, who cared for a stone with a red face in a nearby lake. During a winter famine, the stone provided fish, seals, and eventually whales, which sustained the villagers.

The Haida Nation people have traditionally harvested a wide variety of resources within Nang Xaldangaas, including salmon, halibut, cod, shellfish, edible seaweed, herring roe deposited on kelp, seabird eggs, sea urchins, octopi, and chitons. Resources on land include western redcedar and cedar bark, medicinal plants, and animals taken through hunting and trapping. Certain halibut fishing grounds within Masset Inlet have historically been owned and managed through the Haida potlatch system. Historically, the area's productive marine and terrestrial environments supported numerous Haida settlements and extensive coastal trade. More than ten village sites are recognized along the shoreline. The Masset Inlet area was an important center of canoe travel, with expeditions undertaken for trade, visits to relatives, potlatch ceremonies, warfare, and raiding. Archaeological evidence includes shell middens, stone tools, house depressions, culturally modified trees, and remains of plank houses.

The name Nang Xaldangaas comes from the X̱aad Kíl dialect of the Northern Haida language, and means "the Slave" or "Enslaved One", originally referring to a particularly dangerous stretch of sea off Miiya Kún (Seven Mile Point), near the entrance to Masset Inlet. Former former president of the Council of the Haida Nation Gidansda Guujaaw described the area as being known for turbulent waters from the strong outflow of Masset Inlet under northerly and westerly winds, in a proximity to the sheltered waters of Masset Inlet that gave mariners a false sense of security, to which numerous boats were lost. An October 2018 article in Haida Nation publication Haida Laas identifies conservancy as being named for these dangerous waters. The 2011 management plan gives an approximate pronunciation as "Nang Chaldangas".

=== Establishment of the conservancy ===
In 1996, the provincial government identified the northwestern shoreline of Graham Island as an area for consideration under its Protected Areas Strategy, and in 2004, the Council of the Haida Nation promulgated a land use vision, which led to the signing of the Haida Gwaii Strategic Land Use Agreement, between the Haida Nation and British Columbia, on December 12, 2007. The terrestrial portion of Nang Xaldangaas Conservancy was formally established by a provincial order in on December 17, 2008, and was formally announced by the provincial government on January 8, 2009. It was thereafter included in the Protected Areas of British Columbia Amendment Act, 2009, and received royal assent on October 29, 2009.

As of November 2026, at least 32 archaeological sites have been documented within the conservancy, with evidence of plank houses, shell middens, stone tools, and hearths. Archaeological surveys have also identified at least 182 culturally modified trees, including trees bearing evidence of traditional bark harvesting.

== Geography ==
The conservancy sits west of the communities of Old Massett and Masset, extending along some 60 kilometres of coastline from Masset Sound and Masset Harbour on Dixon Entrance to Virago Sound and the eastern shore of Naden Harbour. It is within the Queen Charlotte Lowlands terrestrial ecosection, with its marine portion within the Dixon Entrance marine ecosection, and with elevations ranging from sea level to 91 metres. The eastern portion is underlain by sedimentary rocks of the Skonun Formation, principally mudstone, siltstone, and shale, deposited in marine environments during the late Neogene and Quaternary. In contrast, the northern and western portions are characterized by basaltic volcanic rocks formed by lava flows approximately 25 million years ago, and exposed along sections of the coastline, forming rocky reefs and offshore banks. Scattered across both the sedimentary and volcanic landscapes are Pleistocene glacial deposits up to the size of boulders.

The landscape is primarily low-lying coastal terrain, including sandy beaches, tidal flats, rocky shores, forests, and wetlands. The conservancy is within a larger network of protected areas on Haida Gwaii, with other nearby protected areas including Kamdis Conservancy, Kumdis Conservancy, Drizzle Lake Ecological Reserve, Pure Lake Provincial Park, and Naikoon Provincial Park. The combination of rocky reefs and strong tidal currents, as well as exposure to northerly and westerly winds, makes portions of the coastline hazardous for navigation, particularly near Seven Mile Point at the entrance to Masset Inlet.
