= Quatsino Limestone =

Geological formation in British Columbia, Canada

Coordinates: 50.28°N 126.50°W

- Stratigraphic range: Triassic
- Type: Formation

Location
- Region: British Columbia
- Country: Canada

The Quatsino Limestone is a geologic formation in British Columbia. It preserves fossils dating back to the Triassic period.

== Open Bay ==
At Open Bay the limestone of the Quatsino formation has been subjected to strong ductile deformation that likely formed during a regional tectonic event.

== See also ==
- List of fossiliferous stratigraphic units in British Columbia
- Various Contributors to the Paleobiology Database. "Fossilworks: Gateway to the Paleobiology Database". Archived from the original on 19 August 2022.
