= Miette Group =

Geologic assemblage in the Yukon, Canada

- Stratigraphic range: Neoproterozoic
- Type: Geologic Group
- Unit of: Windermere Supergroup
- Sub-units: Byng Formation; Hector Formation (Canada); Old Fort Point Formation; Corral Creek Formation
- Thickness: more than 3,000 m (10,000 ft)

Lithology
- Primary: Phyllite, schist, quartzite
- Other: Conglomerate, dolomite

Location
- Region: Alberta, British Columbia
- Country: Canada

Type section
- Named for: Miette Range
- Named by: C. D. Walcott

The Miette Group is an assemblage of metamorphosed sedimentary rocks of latest Precambrian (Neoproterozoic) age. It is present in the Canadian Cordillera from the Lake Louise area of Alberta to the Yukon. The Miette rocks include Ediacaran fossils, stromatolites, and trace fossils.

== See also ==
- List of fossiliferous stratigraphic units in British Columbia
