= Cushina Formation =

- Stratigraphic range: Ordovician
- Type: Formation

Location
- Region: British Columbia
- Country: Canada

The Cushina Formation is a geologic formation in British Columbia. It preserves fossils dating back to the Ordovician period.

== See also ==
- List of fossiliferous stratigraphic units in British Columbia
