= Cold Fish Volcanics =

Geological formation in British Columbia

- Stratigraphic range: Jurassic
- Type: Formation

Location
- Region: British Columbia
- Country: Canada

The Cold Fish Volcanics are a geologic formation in British Columbia, Canada. It preserves fossils dating back to the Jurassic period.

== See also ==
- List of fossiliferous stratigraphic units in British Columbia
