= Spence Bridge Formation =

- Stratigraphic range: Aptian; ~120–112 Ma
- Type: Formation

Location
- Region: British Columbia
- Country: Canada

The Spence Bridge Formation is a geologic formation in British Columbia. It preserves fossils dating back to the Cretaceous period.

== See also ==
- List of fossiliferous stratigraphic units in British Columbia
