= Cedar District Formation =

Geologic formation in the Pacific Northwest

- Stratigraphic range: Campanian ~80 Ma
- Type: Formation
- Unit of: Nanaimo Group
- Underlies: Denman/De Courcy Formation
- Overlies: Protection Formation
- Area: Southeastern Vancouver Island, Gulf Islands, San Juan Islands

Location
- Region: British Columbia, Washington (state)
- Country: Canada, United States

Type section
- Named for: Cedar District on Vancouver Island

The Cedar District Formation is a geologic formation exposed on Vancouver Island, the Gulf Islands of British Columbia and San Juan Islands of Washington (state). It preserves fossils dating back to the Campanian Epoch of the Cretaceous period. It dates to the lower mid-Campanian.

== Paleobiology ==
=== Flora ===
- Suciacarpa starrii

=== Fauna ===
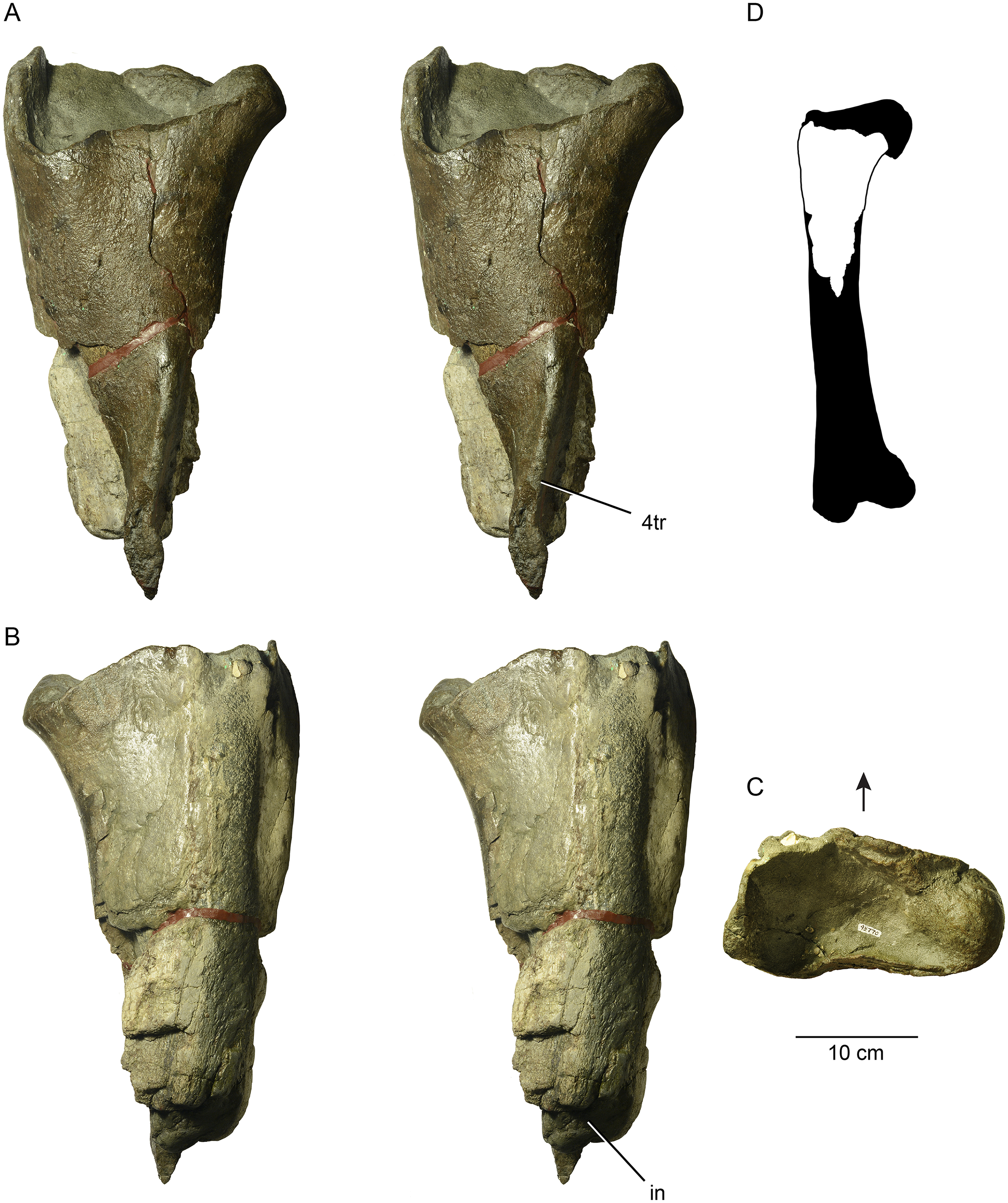
Partial left femur of indeterminate Theropod

- Baculites rex
- Baculites anceps
- Baculites occidentalis
- Baculites inornatus
- Anapachydiscus nelchinensis
- Metaplacenticeras sp.
- Canadoceras newberryanum
- Pachydiscus neevesi
- Hoplitoplacenticeras vancouverense
- Gaudryceras denmanense
- Neophylloceras sp.
- Condonella suciensis
- Ornithomimidae indet.
- Ornithomimosauria Indet.
- Theropoda indet. (possibly Tyrannosauridae)

== See also ==
- List of fossiliferous stratigraphic units in Washington (state)
- Paleontology in Washington (state)
