= Phantom Creek Formation =

Geologic formation in British Columbia, Canada

- Stratigraphic range: Toarcian; ~183–175 Ma
- Type: Formation
- Unit of: Maude Group

Lithology
- Primary: Sandstone

Location
- Coordinates: 53.4°N 132.3°W
- Approximate paleocoordinates: 4.2°N 126.4°W
- Region: British Columbia
- Country: Canada
- Extent: Queen Charlotte Islands
- Phantom Creek Formation (Canada) Phantom Creek Formation (British Columbia)

The Phantom Creek Formation is a geologic formation of the Maude Group in British Columbia. It preserves fossils dating back to the Early Jurassic period.

== See also ==
- List of fossiliferous stratigraphic units in British Columbia
