= Cache Creek Group =

Geologic group in Canada

- Stratigraphic range: Permian
- Type: Group

Location
- Region: British Columbia
- Country: Canada

The Cache Creek Group is a geologic group in British Columbia. It preserves fossils dating back to the Permian period.

== See also ==
- List of fossiliferous stratigraphic units in British Columbia
