= Otter Mountain =

Mountain in British Columbia, Canada

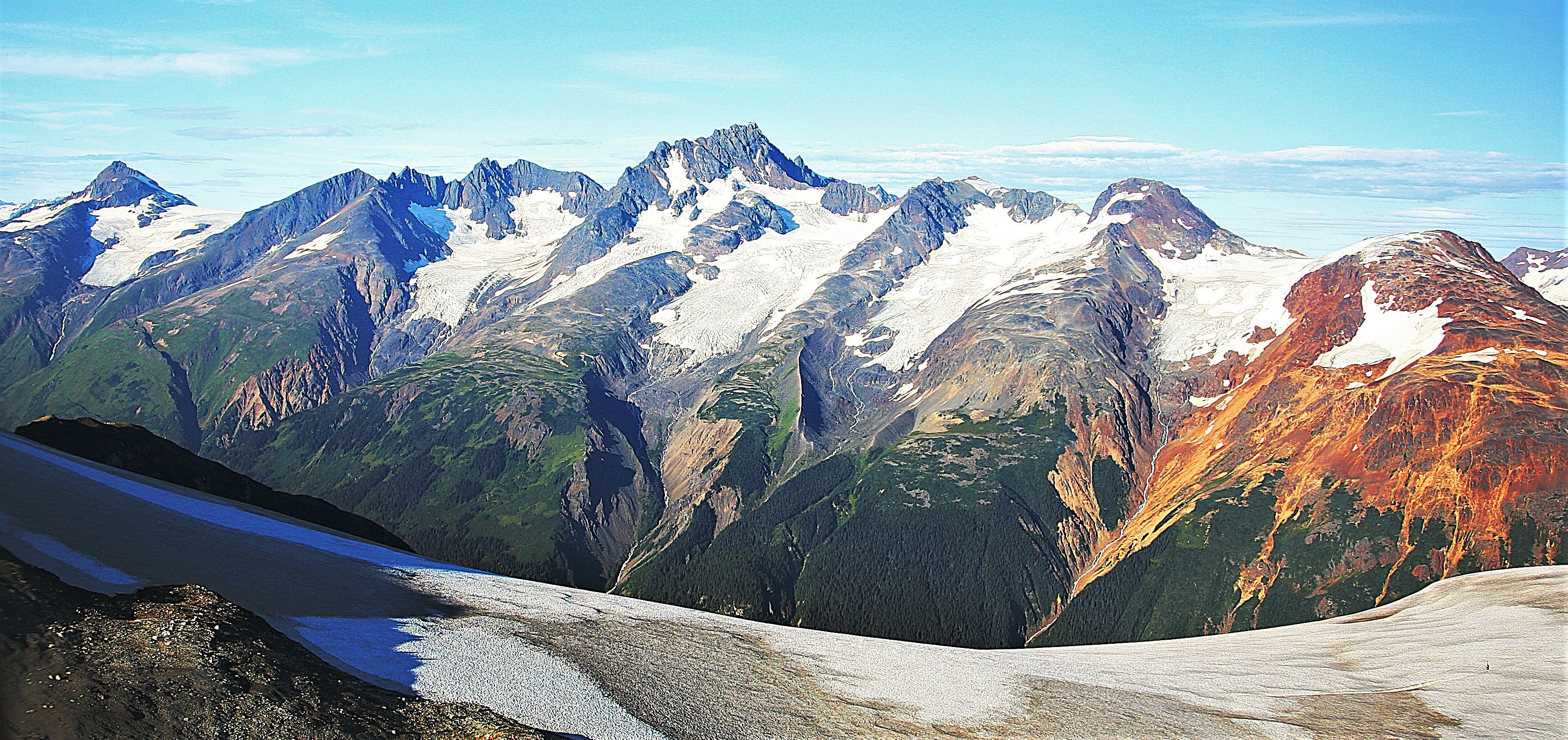
- West aspect

Highest point
- Elevation: 2,693 m (8,835 ft)
- Prominence: 2,242 m (7,356 ft)
- Parent peak: Mount Pattullo (2727 m)
- Isolation: 25.4 km (15.8 mi)
- Listing: Highest major summits of Canada; Most prominent of Canada; Mountain peaks of Canada
- Coordinates: 56°00′24″N 129°41′34″W

Geography
- Location within British Columbia Location within Canada
- Interactive map of Otter Mountain
- Location: British Columbia, Canada
- District: Cassiar Land District
- Parent range: Coast Mountains; Boundary Ranges
- Topo map: NTS 104A4 Bear River

Otter Mountain is a prominent 2,693-metre (8,835-foot) glaciated summit located in the Coast Mountains of British Columbia, Canada. It is situated 16 kilometres (9.9 miles) northeast of Stewart, British Columbia, and the nearest higher peak is Mount Pattullo, 25.4 km (15.8 mi) to the north. Otter ranks as the 23rd most topographically prominent summit of Canada. Topographic relief is significant as the summit rises 2,380 metres (7,810 feet) above Bitter Creek Valley in 5 kilometres (3.1 miles). This mountain's toponym was adopted as "Mount Otter" on 24 July 1945, and officially renamed Otter Mountain on 5 November 1953 by the Geographical Names Board of Canada. Precipitation runoff from the mountain drains west into Bitter Creek which is a tributary of the Bear River, or east to Nelson Creek which is part of the Nass River drainage basin, and all ultimately finds its way to the Inside Passage.

== Climate ==
Based on the Köppen climate classification, Otter Mountain is located in a subarctic climate zone of western North America. Most weather fronts originate in the Pacific Ocean, and travel east toward the Coast Mountains where they are forced upward by the range (Orographic lift), causing them to drop their moisture in the form of rain or snowfall. As a result, the Coast Mountains experience high precipitation, especially during the winter months in the form of snowfall. Temperatures can drop below −20 °C with wind chill factors below −30 °C. This climate supports several glaciers on Otter Mountain's western flank, the Bear River Glacier on the north aspect, and the Cambria Icefield to the east and south.

== Gallery ==
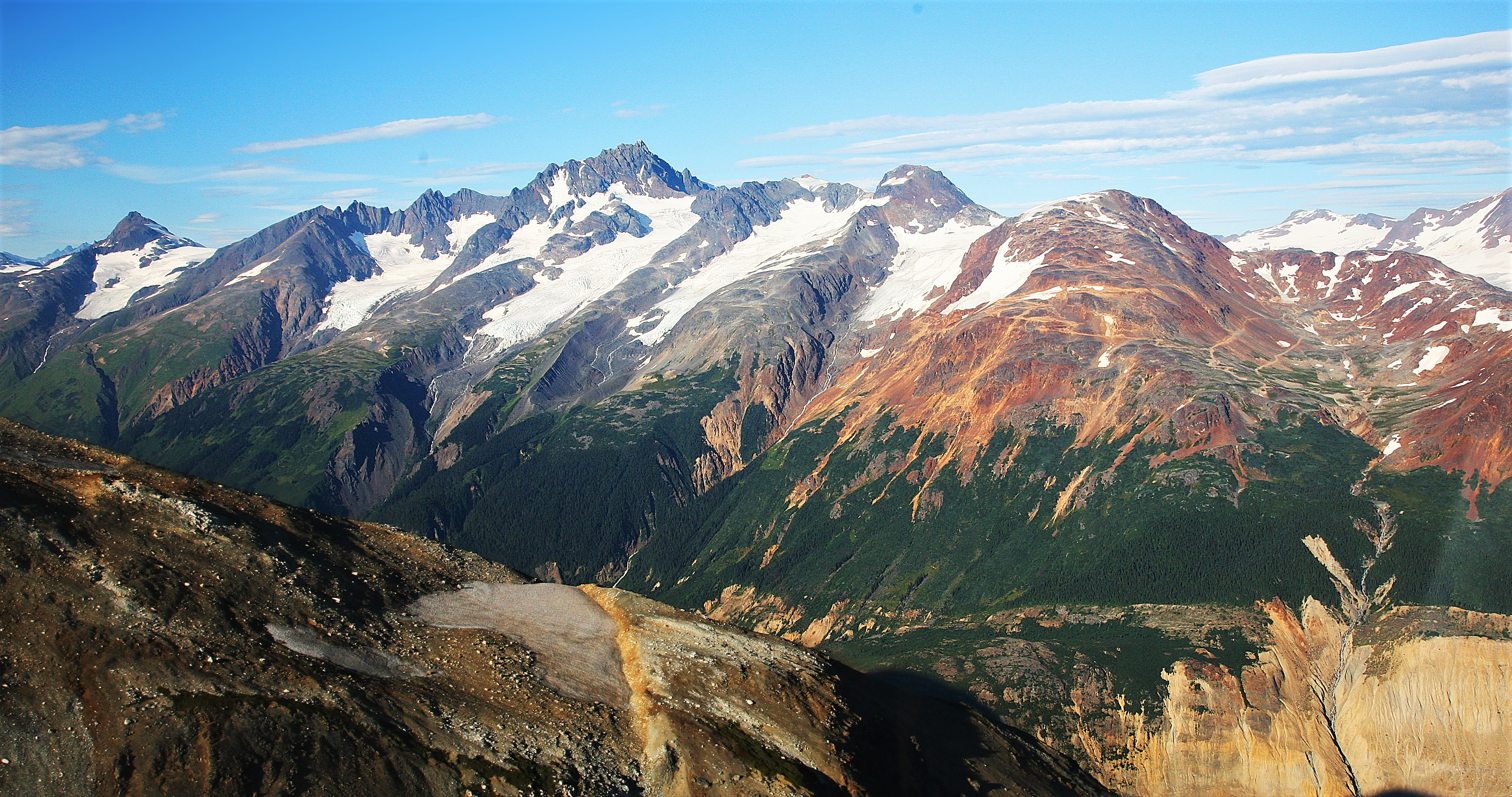
Otter Mountain from the west. Cambria Peak furthest to the left, and Red Mountain Project (gold mine) visible to the right

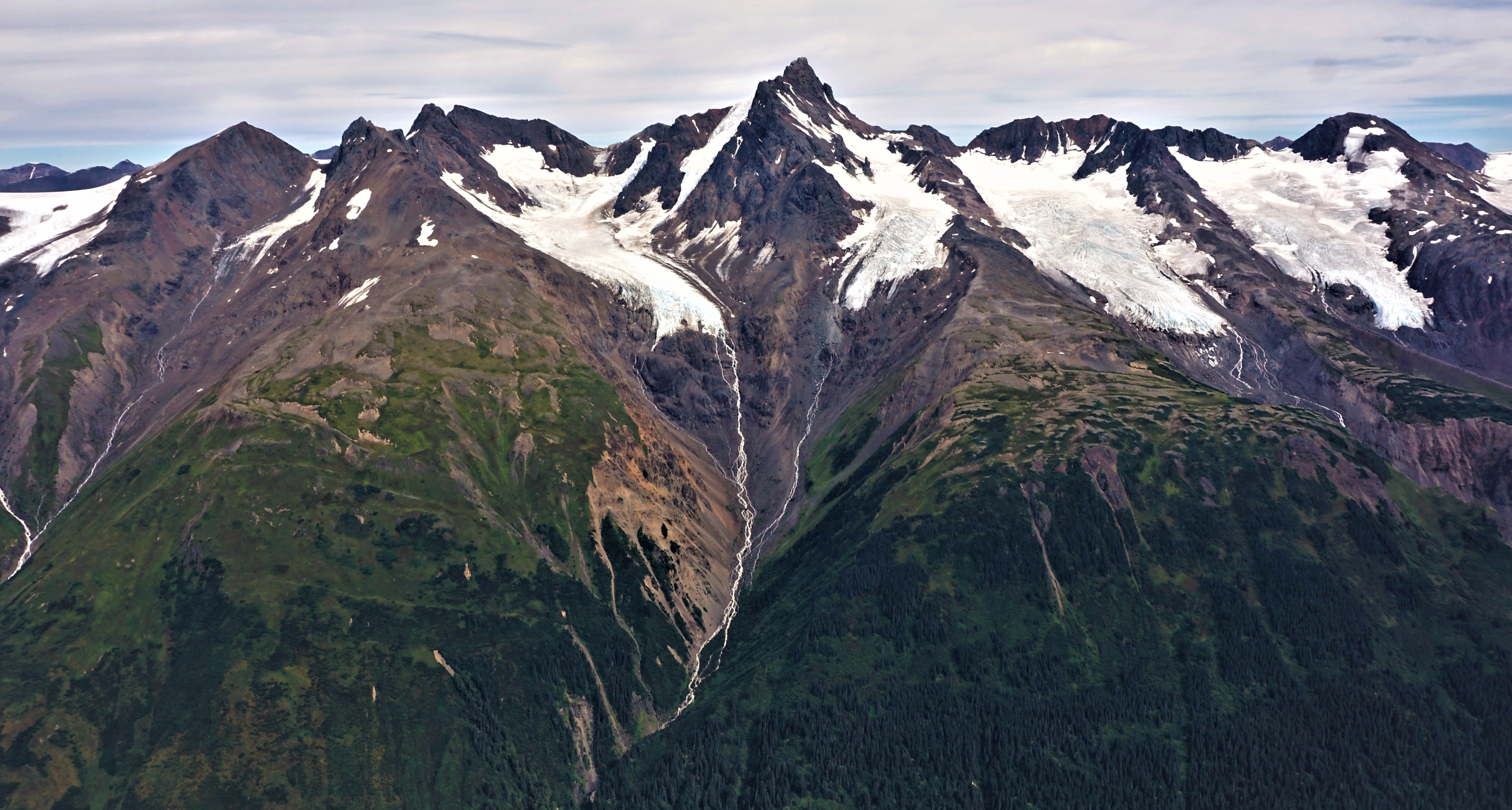

== See also ==
- List of the most prominent summits of Canada
