= Sandilands Formation =

Geologic formation in British Columbia

- Stratigraphic range: Triassic-Jurassic
- Type: Formation

Location
- Region: British Columbia
- Country: Canada

The Sandilands Formation is a geologic formation in British Columbia. It preserves fossils dating back to the Triassic and Jurassic period.

== See also ==
- List of fossiliferous stratigraphic units in British Columbia
