= Carmanah Formation =

Geologic formation in British Columbia, Canada

- Stratigraphic range: Paleogene
- Type: Formation

Location
- Region: British Columbia
- Country: Canada

The Carmanah Formation is a geologic formation in British Columbia. It preserves fossils dating back to the Paleogene period.

== See also ==
- List of fossiliferous stratigraphic units in British Columbia
