= Cache Creek Formation =

- Stratigraphic range: Permian
- Type: Formation

Location
- Region: British Columbia
- Country: Canada

The Cache Creek Formation is a geologic formation in British Columbia. It preserves fossils dating back to the Permian period.

== See also ==
- List of fossiliferous stratigraphic units in British Columbia
