= Owen Creek Formation =

Geologic formation in Canada

- Stratigraphic range: Middle Ordovician; ~470–460 Ma
- Type: Formation
- Underlies: Mount Wilson Formation
- Overlies: Skoki Formation
- Thickness: Up to about 199 m (652 feet)

Lithology
- Primary: Dolomite
- Other: Siltstone, sandstone, mudstone

Location
- Coordinates: 52°00′00″N 116°45′00″W
- Region: Alberta; British Columbia
- Country: Canada

Type section
- Named for: Owen Creek
- Named by: B.S. Norford, 1969.

The Owen Creek Formation is a stratigraphic unit of Middle Ordovician age. It is present on the western edge of the Western Canada Sedimentary Basin in the Canadian Rockies of Alberta and British Columbia. It consists primarily of dolomite and was named for Owen Creek near Mount Wilson in Banff National Park by B.S. Norford in 1969.

== Lithology and thickness ==
The Owen Creek Formation consists primarily of dolomite that typically includes minor amounts of quartz silt and very fine sand. There are minor beds of dolomitic mudstone near the base, and beds of dolomitic quartz sandstone and siltstone in the upper part. It has a maximum thickness of about 199 m (652 ft).

== Distribution and relationship to other units ==
The Owen Creek Formation is present in the southern Canadian Rockies and is equivalent to the black shales Glenogle Formation to the west. It is also present in some areas of the central Rockies in northeastern British Columbia. It overlies the Skoki Formation, and unconformably underlies the Mount Wilson Formation.
