= Mount Wilson Formation =

Geologic formation in Canada

- Stratigraphic range: Late Ordovician; ~470–450 Ma
- Type: Formation
- Underlies: Beaverfoot Formation
- Overlies: Owen Creek Formation or Glenogle Formation
- Thickness: Up to about 450 m (1476 feet)

Lithology
- Primary: Quartz sandstone

Location
- Coordinates: 52°00′00″N 116°45′00″W
- Region: Alberta; British Columbia
- Country: Canada

Type section
- Named for: Mount Wilson
- Named by: C.D. Walcott, 1923

The Mount Wilson Formation is a stratigraphic unit of Late Ordovician age. It is present on the western edge of the Western Canada Sedimentary Basin in the Rocky Mountains of Alberta and British Columbia. It consists of quartz sandstone, and was named for the Mount Wilson in Banff National Park by C.D. Walcott in 1923.

== Lithology and thickness ==
The Mount Wilson Formation consists of light grey to white, thin- to thick-bedded quartz sandstone that is well-cemented by clear quartz. It reaches a thickness of about 450 m (1476 feet) south of Golden, British Columbia.

== Distribution and relationship to other units ==
The Mount Wilson Formation is present in the Rocky Mountains of Alberta and British Columbia. It rests conformably on the Owen Creek Formation in the eastern main ranges and on the Glenogle Formation in the western main ranges, and is overlain by the Beaverfoot Formation.
