= Bonanza Formation =

- Stratigraphic range: Jurassic
- Type: Formation

Location
- Region: British Columbia
- Country: Canada

The Bonanza Formation is a geologic formation in British Columbia, Canada. It preserves fossils dating back to the Jurassic Period.

== See also ==
- List of fossiliferous stratigraphic units in British Columbia
