= Fannin Formation =

- Stratigraphic range: Pliensbachian-Toarcian; ~190–175 Ma
- Type: Formation
- Unit of: Maude Group
- Sub-units: Rennell Junction Member

Lithology
- Primary: Sandstone, limestone
- Other: Siltstone, mudstone, shale

Location
- Coordinates: 53.2°N 132.0°W
- Approximate paleocoordinates: 3.1°N 126.3°W
- Region: British Columbia
- Country: Canada
- Fannin Formation (Canada) Fannin Formation (British Columbia)

The Fannin Formation is a geologic formation in British Columbia. It preserves fossils dating back to the Early Jurassic period (Pliensbachian to Toarcian stages).

== See also ==
- List of fossiliferous stratigraphic units in British Columbia
