= Atan Group =

Geologic group in Canada

- Stratigraphic range: Cambrian
- Type: Group

Location
- Region: British Columbia
- Country: Canada

The Atan Group is a geologic group in British Columbia. It preserves fossils dating back to the Cambrian period.

== See also ==
- List of fossiliferous stratigraphic units in British Columbia
