= Bocock Group =

Geologic group in Canada

- Stratigraphic range: Triassic
- Type: Group

Location
- Region: British Columbia
- Country: Canada

The Bocock Group is a geologic group in British Columbia. It preserves fossils dating back to the Triassic period.

== See also ==
- List of fossiliferous stratigraphic units in British Columbia
