= Ptarmigan Formation =

Geologic formation in the UK

- Stratigraphic range: Cambrian
- Type: Formation

Location
- Region: British Columbia
- Country: Canada

The Ptarmigan Formation is a geologic formation in British Columbia. It preserves fossils dating back to the Cambrian period.

== See also ==
- List of fossiliferous stratigraphic units in British Columbia
