= Skonun Formation =

- Stratigraphic range: Neogene
- Type: Formation

Location
- Region: British Columbia
- Country: Canada

The Skonun Formation is a geologic formation in British Columbia. It preserves fossils dating back to the Neogene period.

== See also ==
- List of fossiliferous stratigraphic units in British Columbia
