= Harrison Lake, Indiana =

- Census-designated place
- Location within Indiana Location within the United States
- Coordinates: 39°11′08″N 86°01′32″W
- Country: United States
- State: Indiana
- County: Bartholomew
- Township: Harrison

Area
  - Total: 0.42 sq mi (1.1 km^{2})
  - Land: 0.27 sq mi (0.70 km^{2})
  - Water: 0.16 sq mi (0.41 km^{2})
- Elevation: 719 ft (219 m)
- Time zone: UTC-5 (Eastern (EST))
  - Summer (DST): UTC-4 (EDT)
- ZIP code: 47201 (Columbus)
- Area codes: 812 & 930
- FIPS code: 18-32098
- GNIS feature ID: 2830312

Harrison Lake is an unincorporated community and census-designated place (CDP) in Bartholomew County, Indiana, United States. It is part of the Columbus, Indiana, metropolitan statistical area.

== Geography ==
The community is in western Bartholomew County, built around two reservoirs on Denios Creek: North Harrison Lake and South Harrison Lake. A third reservoir, Tamerix Lake, lies to the south, outside the CDP. Columbus, the county seat, is 7 miles (11 km) to the east.

According to the United States Census Bureau, the CDP has a total area of 0.42 square miles (1.09 km^{2}), of which 0.27 square miles (0.70 km^{2}) are land and 0.16 square miles (0.41 km^{2}), or 36.97%, are water. Via Denios Creek, the Harrison Lakes drain southeast to the East Fork of the White River.

== Demographics ==
The United States Census Bureau delineated Harrison Lake as a census designated place in the 2022 American Community Survey.
