= Byng Formation =

Geological formation in British Columbia

- Stratigraphic range: Ediacaran
- Type: Formation

Location
- Region: British Columbia
- Country: Canada

The Byng Formation is a geologic formation in British Columbia. It preserves fossils dating back to the Ediacaran period.

== See also ==
- List of fossiliferous stratigraphic units in British Columbia
