= Beaverfoot Formation =

Geologic formation in Canada

- Stratigraphic range: Late Ordovician (Ashgill age)-Early Silurian (Llandovery); ~455–440 Ma
- Type: Formation
- Underlies: Cairn Formation or Tegart Formation
- Overlies: Mount Wilson Formation
- Thickness: Up to about 500 m (1,600 ft)

Lithology
- Primary: Dolomite, limestone
- Other: Chert

Location
- Coordinates: 51°07′00″N 116°40′00″W
- Approximate paleocoordinates: 0.4°S 63.2°W
- Region: British Columbia; Alberta
- Country: Canada
- Extent: Western Canada Sedimentary Basin & Rocky Mountains, British Columbia and Alberta; Purcell Mountains, British Columbia

Type section
- Named for: Beaverfoot Range
- Named by: L.D. Burling
- Year defined: 1922
- Beaverfoot Formation (Canada) Beaverfoot Formation (Alberta)

The Beaverfoot Formation is a stratigraphic unit of Late Ordovician (Ashgill age) to Early Silurian (Llandovery) age. It is present on the western edge of the Western Canada Sedimentary Basin in the Rocky Mountains of British Columbia and Alberta, and the Purcell Mountains of British Columbia. It consists of carbonate rocks, and was named for the Beaverfoot Range at Pedley Pass southeast of Golden, British Columbia by L.D. Burling in 1922.

The formation is fossiliferous and is known for its brachiopod faunas. It also contains rugose corals and conodonts.

== Thickness and lithology ==
The Beaverfoot Formation is about 500 m (1640 ft) thick at its type section in Pedley Pass. It was deposited in shallow tropical waters on the western edge of a carbonate platform as limestone, much of which has been altered to dolomite. Chert nodules are present in some beds.

== Distribution and relationship to other units ==
The Beaverfoot Formation is present in the western ranges of the Rocky Mountains of British Columbia and forms cliffs along the eastern wall of the Rocky Mountain Trench. It is also present in the Purcell Range west of Radium, British Columbia, and in the main ranges of the Alberta Rockies between the Clearwater and North Saskatchewan Rivers. It disconformably overlies the Mount Wilson Formation or older rocks. It is conformably overlain by the Tegart Formation in the western ranges, and unconformably overlain by the Late Devonian Cairn Formation to the east in Alberta.

== Paleontology ==
The Beaverfoot Formation spans the Ordovician-Silurian boundary and records faunal changes that occurred during the Ordovician-Silurian extinction events. It is known for fossil rhynchonellid, atrypid, and pentamerid brachiopods, most of which have undergone silicification and can be separated from the dolomite matrix by treatment with acid. It also contains conodonts and rugose corals (Deiracorallium prolongatum, Salvadorea distincta, Bighornia patella, Bighornia cf. bottei).

== See also ==
- List of fossiliferous stratigraphic units in Alberta
