= Rocky Mountain Group =

- Stratigraphic range: Carboniferous
- Type: Group

Location
- Region: Alberta
- Country: Canada

The Rocky Mountain Group is a geologic group in Alberta. It preserves fossils dating back to the Permian period.

== See also ==
- List of fossiliferous stratigraphic units in Alberta
