= Skoki Formation =

Geologic formation in Canada

- Stratigraphic range: Middle Ordovician ~485–470 Ma
- Type: Formation
- Underlies: Owen Creek Formation
- Overlies: Outram Formation or Tipperary Quartzite
- Thickness: Up to 186 metres (610 ft)

Lithology
- Primary: dolomite
- Other: Limestone

Location
- Coordinates: 51°32′00″N 116°03′39″W
- Region: Canadian Rockies
- Country: Canada

Type section
- Named for: Skoki Mountain
- Named by: Charles Doolittle Walcott

The Skoki Formation is a stratigraphic unit of Early to Middle Ordovician age that is present on the western edge of the Western Canada Sedimentary Basin in the Canadian Rockies of Alberta and British Columbia. It was named for Skoki Mountain near Lake Louise in Banff National Park by Charles Doolittle Walcott in 1928. The Skoki Formation is fossiliferous and includes remains of brachiopods and other marine invertebrates, as well as conodonts and oncolites.

== Lithology and deposition ==
The Skoki Formation formed as a shallow marine shelf along the western shoreline of the North American Craton during Early to Middle Ordovician time. Most of the original limestone was subsequently altered to dolomite. Many beds include quartz sand and silt, and some include layers of brown argillite.

== Distribution and stratigraphic relationships ==
The Skoki is present in the Canadian Rockies of Alberta and British Columbia. It reaches a thickness of up to 186 metres (610 ft) in the southern Rockies and about 500 metres (1800 ft) in the northern Rockies. It conformably overlies the Outram Formation or the Tipperary Quartzite, depending on the location, and underlies the Owen Creek Formation.

== Paleontology ==
The Skoki Formation contains several genera of brachiopods, as well as gastropods, conodonts, cephalopods, trilobites, echinoderms, stromatolites, corals, and oncolites.
