= Sucia Island =

Island of the San Juan islands in Washington, United States

- Map of Sucia and surrounding islands

- Location within Washington (state)
- Etymology: from Spanish 'dirty, foul'

Geography
- Location: Strait of Georgia
- Coordinates: 48°45′13″N 122°54′48″W
- Archipelago: Sucia Islands
- Adjacent to: Echo Bay, Shallow Bay, Fossil Bay, Mud Bay, Snoring Bay

Administration
- United States
- State: Washington
- County: San Juan

Demographics
- Population: 4 (2000)

Sucia Island (/ˈsuːʃə/) is located 2.5 miles (4.0 km) north of Orcas Island, in the San Juan Islands, San Juan County, Washington, United States. It is the largest of an archipelago of ten islands including Sucia Island, Little Sucia, Ewing, Justice, Herndon, the Cluster Islands islets, and several smaller, unnamed islands. The group of islands is about 2.5 miles (4.0 km) in length and just under half a mile wide. Sucia island is roughly shaped like a hand. The total land area of all the islands is 2.74 km² (1.06 sq mi; 680 acres), while the main island, Sucia Island, alone measures 2.259 km² (0.872 sq mi; 558 acres). According to the 2000 census, there was a permanent population of four people, all residing on Sucia Island. Sucia Island Marine State Park is a part of Washington State Parks.

== History ==
Sucia Island's name originated with the Spanish Captain Francisco de Eliza, who included it on his 1791 map. He named it "Isla Sucia". Sucia means "dirty" in Spanish; in a nautical sense, it can mean "foul." This word was chosen because the shore was deemed dangerous due to reefs and hidden rocks.

These reefs and broken shorelines are the result of geologic folding of the Earth's crust, which brought many marine fossils to the surface. Some good examples can be found on the southeast arm of Sucia Island.

The isolated coves and bays of Sucia Island once served the Lummi Indians in their seal hunting days. They later provided excellent hideouts in the 19th century for smugglers of illegal Chinese laborers, as well as for hiding illegally imported wool and opium. Still later, the islands played a large role in rum-running during liquor Prohibition in the 1920s and 1930s, and in recent years they have figured in drug trafficking.

The first known Euro-American settler on the island was Charles Henry Wiggins, who moved to the island in the 1880s with his wife, Mary Luzier, a Cowlitz Indian. The Wiggins family had lived previously on nearby Waldron Island, but left for Sucia after government agents seized eight of their children and took them to Chemawa Indian School in Salem, Oregon. The couple had five more children on Sucia and established a farm with fruit trees, cows, and sheep. Wiggins Head at the southeast end of the island is named after the family.

The cluster of Sucia Islands was purchased in 1960 by the Puget Sound Interclub Association and later donated to the State of Washington for protection as a Marine State Park.

In 2012, paleontologists Christian Sidor and Brandon Peecook discovered a fossilized femur bone from a theropod dinosaur on the island's shore. This was the first dinosaur fossil discovered in Washington state. Given the lack of other fossils from the dinosaur, it's unclear exactly which species of theropod the bone came from.

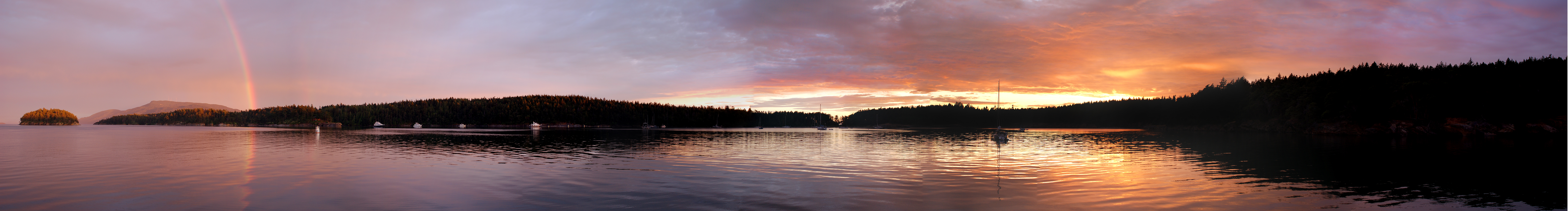
270° Panorama of Echo Bay of Sucia Island, San Juan Islands, Washington. Photographed on the Summer Solstice at sunset during a small rain shower.

== Activities ==
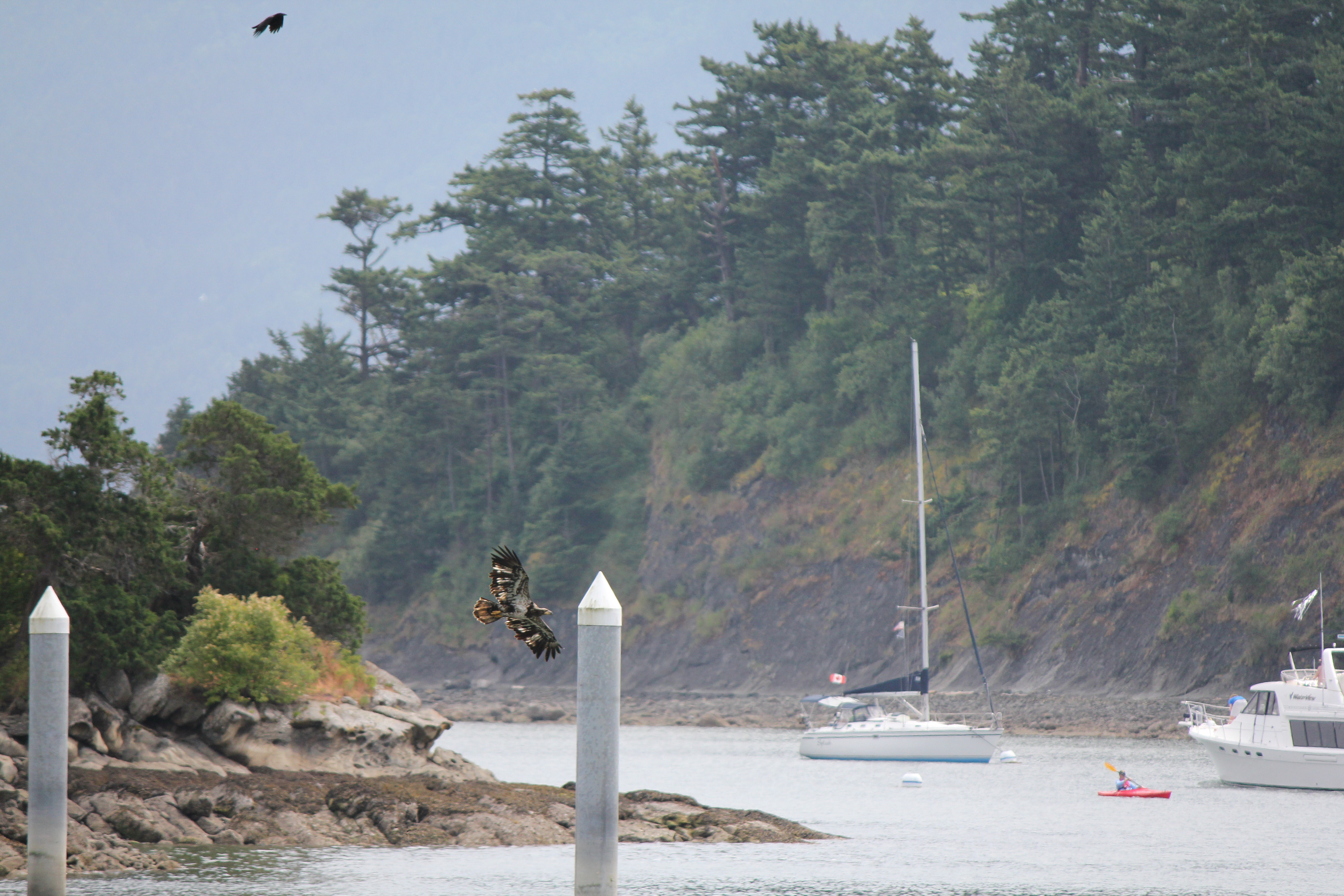
Young bald eagle soars over Sucia Island

- Camping
- Birdwatching
- Hiking
- Rock Climbing
- Kayaking
- Fishing
- Scuba diving
- Crabbing

These activities can be accessed from Sucia Island State Park and the Echo Bay Campground.

== Anchorages ==
=== Shallow Bay ===
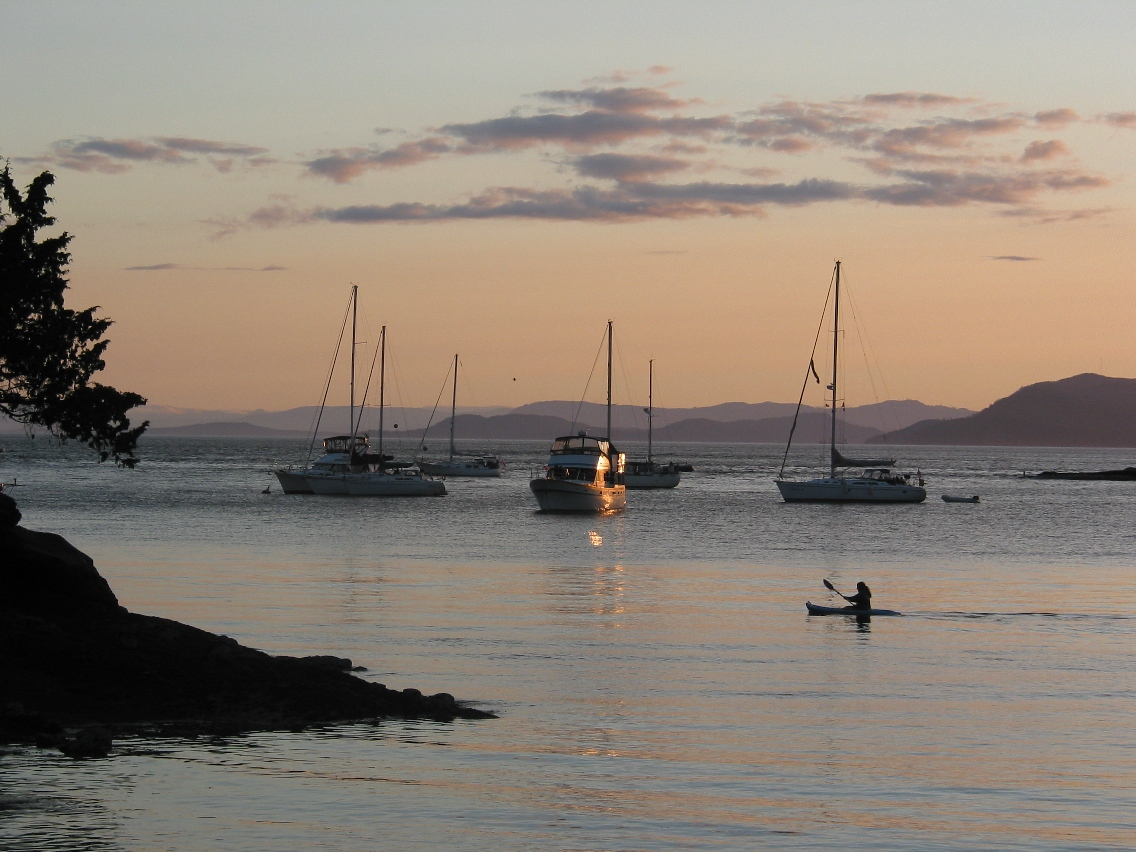
Sunset over the Shallow Bay anchorage

Shallow Bay, located on the island's west side, is protected from all but westerly winds and waves. There are seven mooring buoys and room for 40-50 small pleasure craft in this anchorage. There are beaches on three sides including a sandy beach to the north. Pebble Beach in the center is the access point to the camping and moorage pay station, as well as a large group camping site with a covered eating area and environmentally friendly composting toilets. True to its name, Shallow Bay averages 12 feet (3.7 m) deep. The anchorage provides good holding in sandy areas but the bottom may be rockier towards the center and mouth of the bay.

=== Echo Bay ===
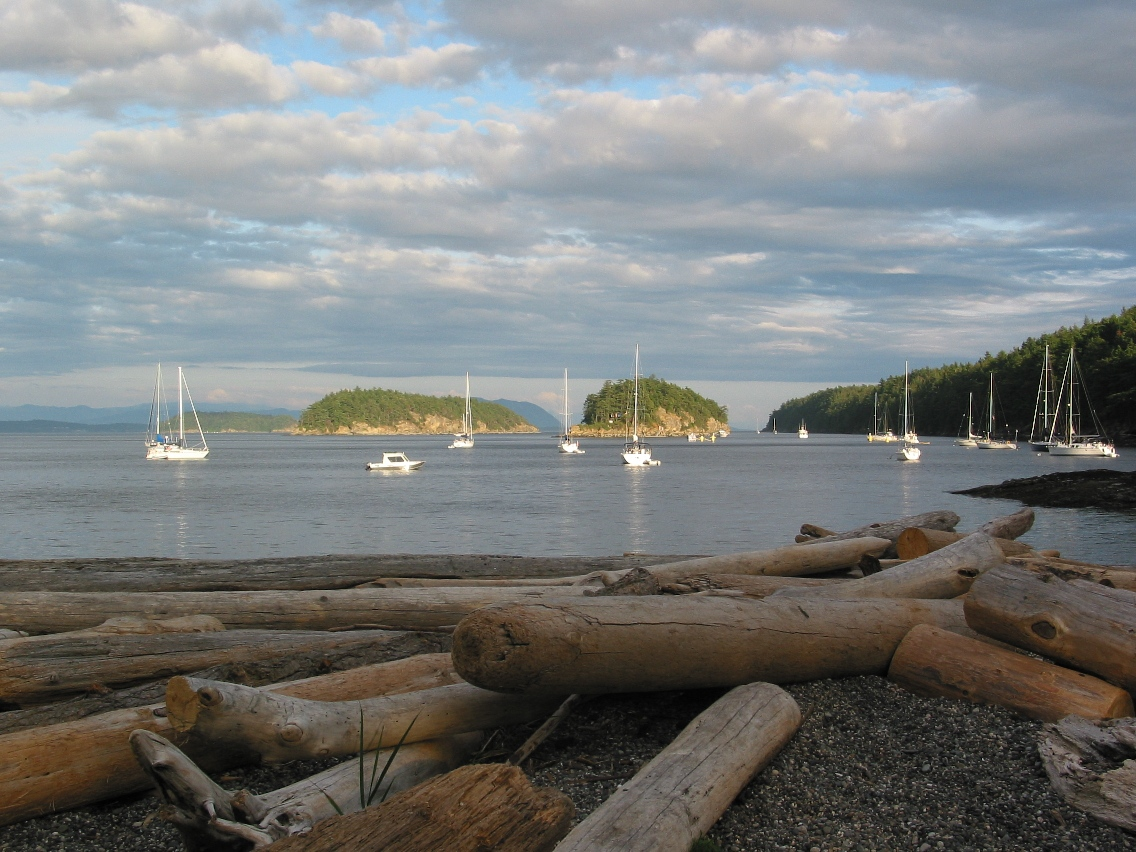
Boats at anchor in Echo Bay

Echo Bay lies directly opposite Shallow Bay, across the island's narrow isthmus. It is the largest of Sucia Island's anchorages, but also the most exposed—particularly to southeast winds. A number of mooring buoys are located close to a pebble beach.

=== Fossil Bay ===
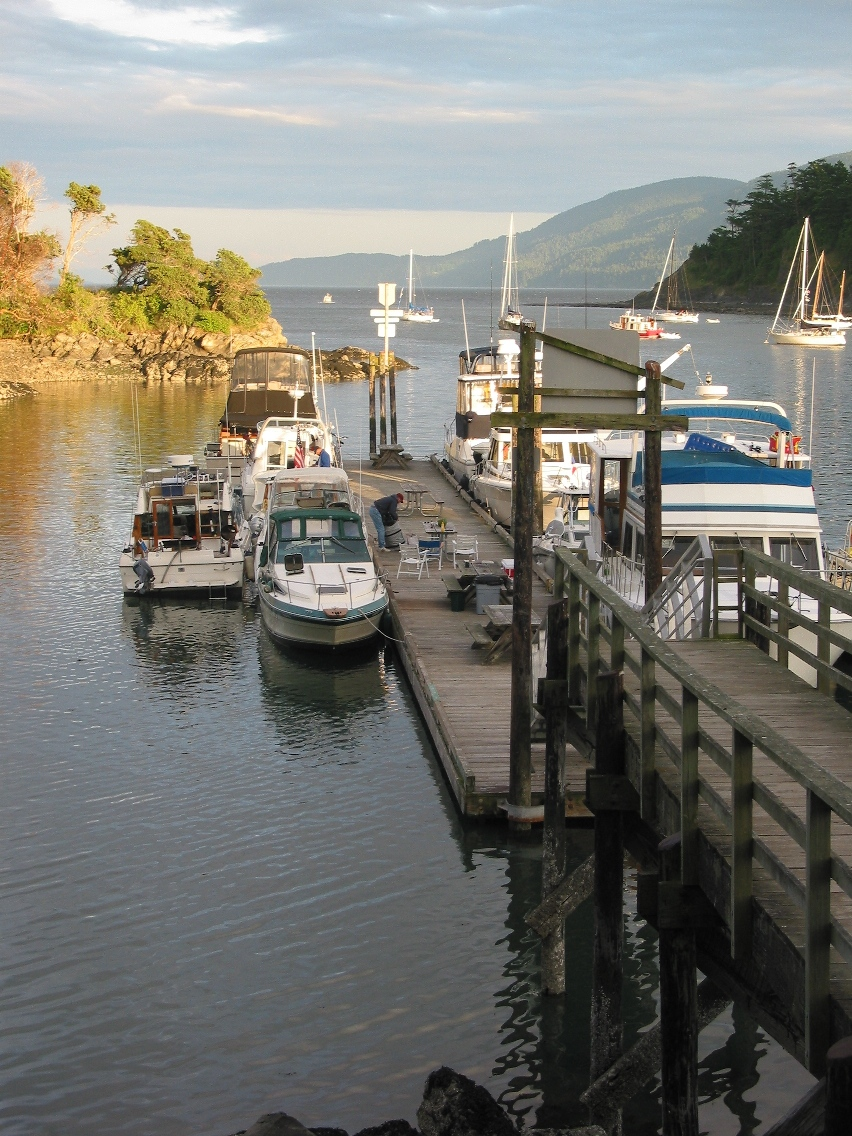
Looking down at Dock 1 from the group campsite

Fossil Bay is one of the most popular anchorages, particularly for small boats that prefer to tie up to one of two docks rather than anchor or pick up a mooring ring. Fossil Bay is an inlet that opens to the southeast.

=== Fox Cove ===
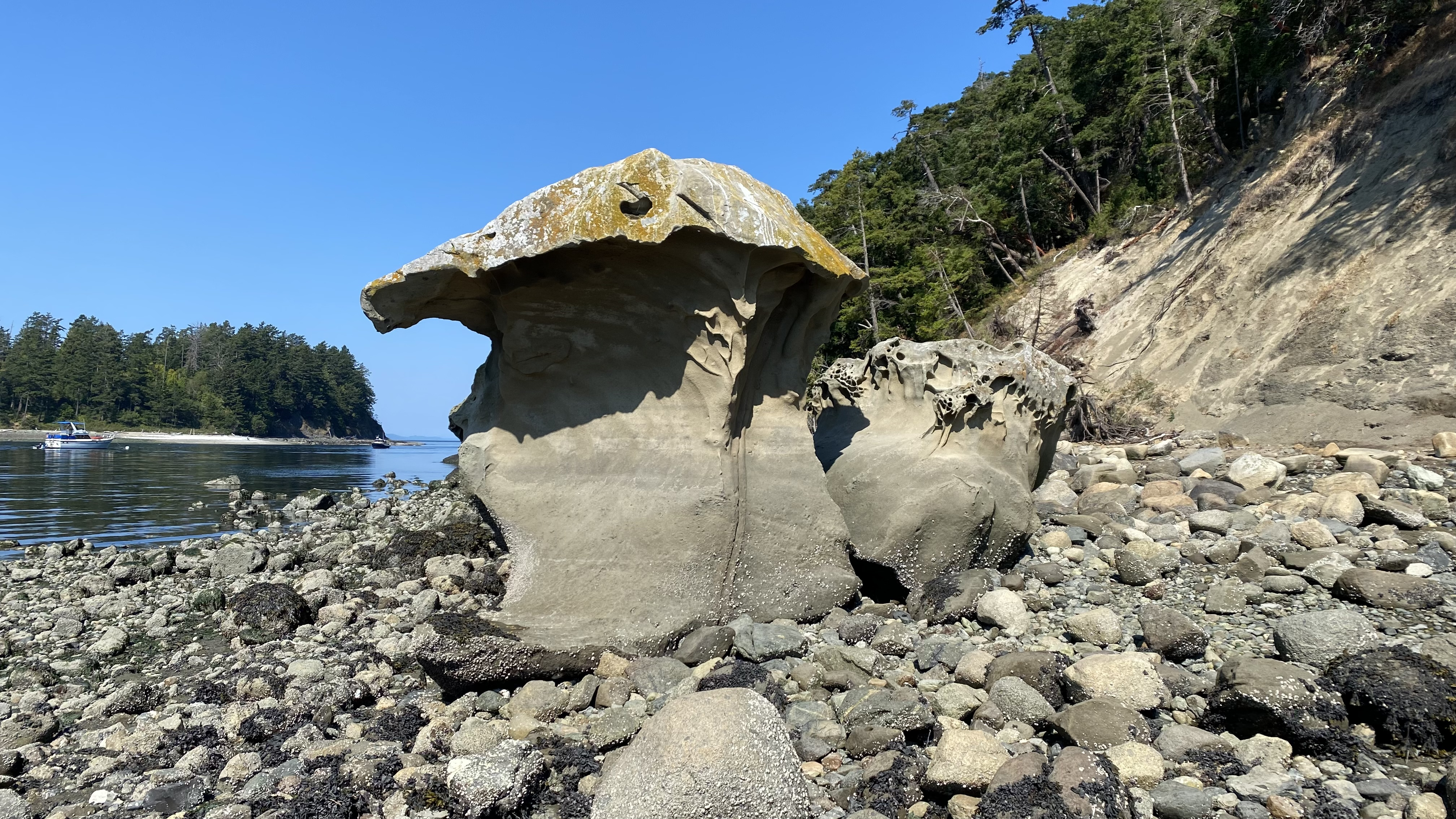
A mushroom rock on the shores of Fox Cove

Fox Cove lies just west of and can be seen from Fossil Bay. Fox Cove is bordered by Ev Henry Finger point and Little Sucia island.

=== Ewing Cove ===
Ewing Cove is between the northeast end of Sucia island and Ewing Island. There is room for several boats at anchor or at a mooring buoy. The pebble beach at Ewing Cove is at the end of a 2.1-mile (3.4 km) trail to the center of the island.
