= Morrissey Formation =

Stratigraphic unit in Canada

- Stratigraphic range: Late Jurassic (Portlandian)
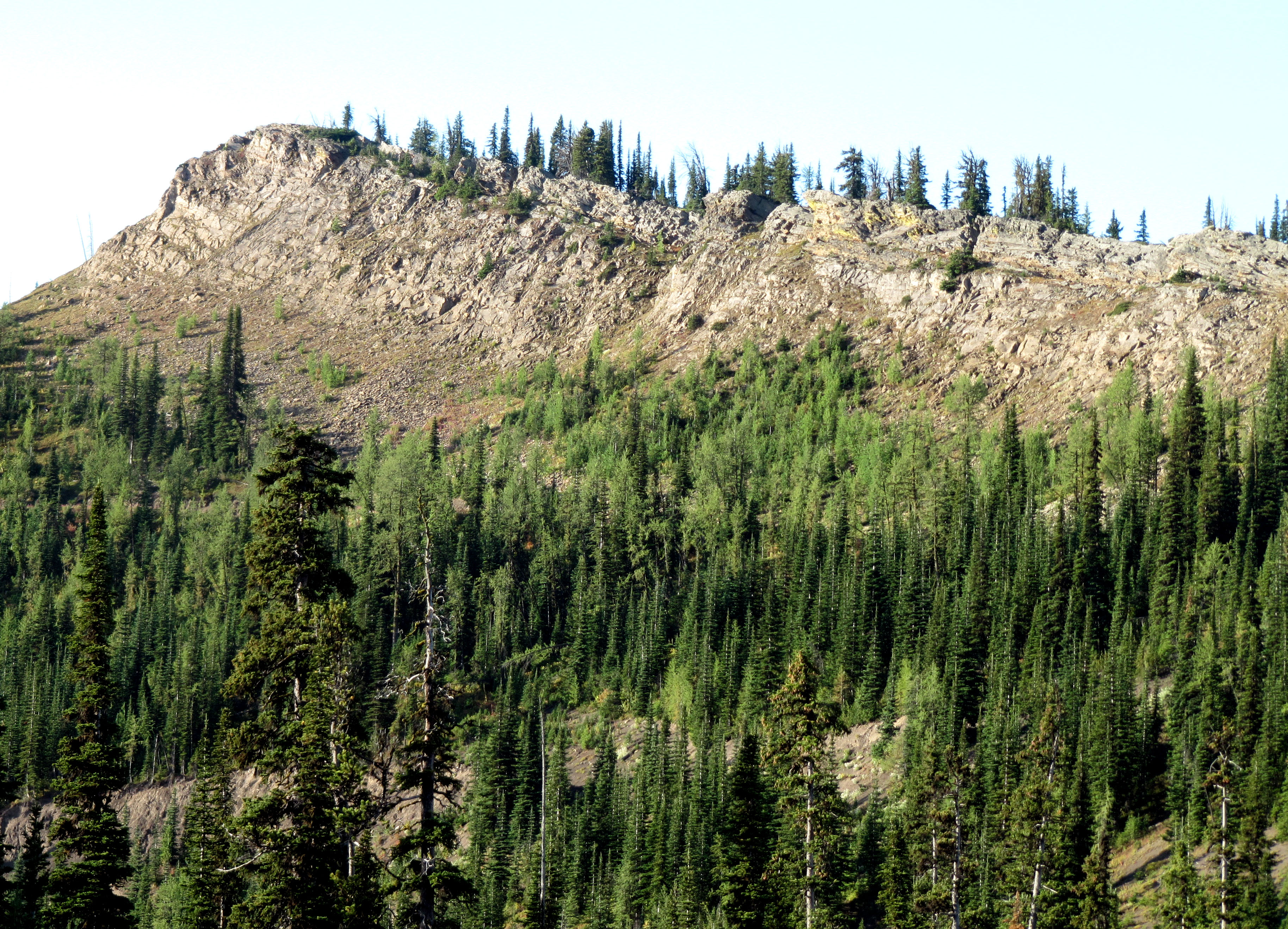
- Outcrops of Morrissey Formation sandstone on a ridge in southeastern British Columbia
- Type: Geological formation
- Unit of: Kootenay Group
- Sub-units: Moose Mountain Member, Weary Ridge Member
- Underlies: Mist Mountain Formation
- Overlies: Fernie Formation
- Thickness: up to 80 metres (260 ft)

Lithology
- Primary: Sandstone
- Other: Siltstone, mudstone, coal

Location
- Coordinates: 50°30′N 114°59′W
- Region: British Columbia; Alberta
- Country: Canada

Type section
- Named for: Morrissey Ridge
- Named by: D.W. Gibson

The Morrissey Formation is a stratigraphic unit of Late Jurassic (Portlandian) age in the Western Canada Sedimentary Basin. It is named for outcrops on Morrissey Ridge, 16 kilometres (10 mi) southeast of Fernie, British Columbia, and is present in southeastern British Columbia and southwestern Alberta.

== Stratigraphy and lithology ==
The Morrissey Formation is the basal unit of the Kootenay Group. It consists of massive, cliff-forming, fine- to coarse-grained sandstone, with minor beds and lenses of conglomeratic sandstone, and rare beds of siltstone, mudstone, carbonaceous mudstone, and coal. The sequence coarsens upward and, in most areas, it can be subdivided into two members, the Weary Ridge Member at the base, and the Moose Mountain Member at the top:

Member	Lithology	Maximum thickness	Reference
Moose Mountain Member	Hard, fine- to coarse-grained, medium grey to brownish grey weathering, siliceous sandstone, with rare interbeds of carbonaceous mudstone, coal, and conglomeratic sandstone	36 m (120 ft)	
Weary Ridge Member	Orange-brown weathering, very fine- to coarse-grained quartz-chert sandstone, slightly argillaceous, carbonaceous, and calcareous, with rare interbeds of siltstone and mudstone	55 m (180 ft)	

== Environment of deposition ==
The Morrissey sediments were derived from newly rising mountain ranges to the west and transported eastward by river systems. They were deposited along the edge of the Western Interior Seaway in extensive littoral, deltaic and beach environments. Thin beds of carbonaceous mudstone and coal near the top of the formation may have been deposited in interdune, lacustrine or swale environments.

== Paleontology and age ==
Fossils, including microfossils, are very rare in the Morrissey Formation. Several genera of molluscs (e.g., Oxytoma, Modiolus, and possibly Pachyteuthis) have been collected from the Weary Ridge Member. A single impression and a few fragments of the ammonite Titanites occidentalis, which have been recovered from the top of the Moose Mountain Member, indicate a Late Jurassic (Portlandian) age. Impressions of logs are also known from the top of Moose Mountain Member.

== Thickness and distribution ==
The Morrissey Formation extends from the Flathead River area of southeastern British Columbia near the Canada–United States border to the North Saskatchewan River in western Alberta. It has a maximum recorded thickness of 80 metres (260 ft) near Mist Mountain and the Highwood Pass in Alberta, and it thins eastward, reaching a zero edge along the eastern foothills of the Canadian Rockies in Alberta.

== Relationship to other units ==
The Morrissey Formation abruptly but conformably overlies the "Passage Beds" at the top of the Fernie Formation, and is in turn abruptly but conformably overlain by the Mist Mountain Formation. To the north in the vicinity of the North Saskatchewan River it interfingers with and grades into the Nikanassin Formation. To the east it was truncated by pre-Aptian erosion and is unconformably overlain by the Cadomin Formation. Its correlation south of the Canada-United States border in Montana is uncertain.
