= Beaver Mines Formation =

Stratigraphic unit in Canada

- Stratigraphic range: Early Cretaceous (Albian)
- Type: Formation
- Unit of: Blairmore Group
- Underlies: Ma Butte Formation
- Overlies: Gladstone Formation
- Thickness: up to 455 m (1,490 ft)

Location
- Region: Alberta; British Columbia
- Country: Canada

Type section
- Named for: Beaver Mines, Alberta
- Named by: G.B. Mellon, 1967

The Beaver Mines Formation is a stratigraphic unit of Early Cretaceous (Albian) age in the Western Canada Sedimentary Basin that is present in southwestern Alberta and southeastern British Columbia, Canada. It was established by G.B. Mellon in 1967 who named it for the hamlet of Beaver Mines, Alberta. It contains a variety of plant fossils.

== Lithology ==
Fine- to coarse-grained greenish-grey sandstone interbedded with greenish-grey mudstone and siltstone, and lesser amounts of conglomerate, bentonite, and tuff. Some conglomerate beds contain pebbles of volcanic origin. Minor argillaceous limestone is present at the top in some areas. The sandstones are feldspathic, in contrast to the quartzose sandstones of the overlying Ma Butte Formation.

== Environment of deposition and paleontology ==
The Beaver Mines Formation was deposited in floodplain and fluvial channel environments by meandering river systems. It contains a variety of plant fossils including remains of ferns, cycads, cycadeoids, Ginkgos and extinct conifers, but remains of flowering plants do not appear until the overlying Ma Butte Formation.

== Distribution and thickness ==
The Beaver Mines Formation is present in the southern foothills of southwestern Alberta and southeastern British Columbia and extends as far north as the Clearwater River where it grades into the Gates Formation of the Luscar Group. It reaches a maximum thickness of about 455 m (1,490 ft) at Ma Butte north of the Crowsnest Pass.

== Relationship to other units ==
The Beaver Mines Formation is part of the Blairmore Group. It disconformably overlies the Gladstone Formation and grades into the Gates Formation of the Luscar Group north of the Clearwater River. It is disconformably overlain by the Ma Butte Formation in the southern foothills and by the Blackstone Formation north of the Red Deer River. To the east, it is correlated with the upper part of the Mannville Group.

== See also ==
- List of fossiliferous stratigraphic units in British Columbia
- Various Contributors to the Paleobiology Database. "Fossilworks: Gateway to the Paleobiology Database". Archived from the original on 25 March 2022.
