= Gorman Creek Formation =

Canadian geologic formation

- Stratigraphic range: Early Cretaceous (Valanginian)
- Type: Formation
- Underlies: Cadomin Formation
- Overlies: Monteith Formation
- Thickness: maximum 1,200 m (3,940 ft)

Lithology
- Primary: Sandstone
- Other: Siltstone, mudstone, coal

Location
- Coordinates: 54.1583°N 120.05°W
- Region: British Columbia; Alberta
- Country: Canada

Type section
- Named for: Gorman Creek
- Named by: D.F. Stott
- Year defined: 1981
- Gorman Creek Formation (Canada)

The Gorman Creek Formation is a geologic formation of Early Cretaceous (Valanginian) age in the Western Canada Sedimentary Basin that consists primarily of nonmarine sediments. It is present in the northern foothills of the Canadian Rockies and the adjacent plains in northeastern British Columbia. Plant fossils and dinosaur tracks have been described from its strata.

== Lithology ==
The Gorman Creek Formation consists of repetitive successions of argillaceous sandstone, siltstone, coaly mudstone, and coal beds. Beds of conglomeratic sandstone are present in some areas, particularly in the upper part of the formation .

== Depositional environment ==
The Gorman Creek Formation was deposited in primarily nonmarine environments adjacent to the Western Interior Seaway. Depositional settings include deltaic, coastal plain, floodplain, and swamp environments.

== Fossil content ==
A variety of plant fossils, palynomorph and microfossils have been described from the Gorman Creek Formation, and dinosaur track-ways are present on bedding surfaces near the Narraway River:

"More than 200 fossil footprints are preserved in at least 8 trackways... The majority of the footprints were made by small theropods, but the most dramatic track-way was made by a large biped whose feet were more than a half meter in length."

== Thickness and distribution ==
The Gorman Creek Formation is present in the foothills of the Canadian Rockies and the adjacent plains from the Sukunka River in northeastern British Columbia to the Berland River in west-central Alberta. It attains a maximum thickness of roughly 1,200 m (3,940 ft) in the foothills near the Kakwa River in Alberta, and it thins to zero beyond the eastern edge of the foothills where it was removed by erosion prior to the deposition of the Cadomin Formation.

== Relationship to other units ==
The Gorman Creek Formation forms the upper part of the Minnes Group. It conformably overlies the Monteith Formation and is unconformably overlain by the Cadomin Formation. To the north it grades into the Beattie Peaks, Monach and Bickford Formations which comprise the upper part of the Minnes Group in that area.

== See also ==
- List of stratigraphic units with theropod tracks
