= Luscar Group =

Stratigraphic unit in Canada

- Stratigraphic range: Early Cretaceous
- Type: Group
- Sub-units: Cadomin Formation, Gladstone Formation, Moosebar Formation, Gates Formation
- Underlies: Blackstone Formation, Shaftesbury Formation
- Overlies: Nikanassin Formation, Minnes Group
- Thickness: about 145 m (480 ft)

Lithology
- Primary: Sandstone, siltstone, mudstone
- Other: Coal, conglomerate

Location
- Coordinates: 53.03246°N 117.32652°W
- Region: Alberta
- Country: Canada

Type section
- Named for: Luscar, Alberta
- Named by: C.W. Langenberg and M.E. McMechan, 1985
- Luscar Group (Canada)

The Luscar Group is a geologic unit of Early Cretaceous age in the Western Canada Sedimentary Basin that is present in the foothills of southwestern Alberta. It is subdivided into a series of formations, some of which contain economically significant coal deposits that have been mined near Cadomin and Luscar. Coal mining in those areas began in the early 1900s, and continued near Luscar as of 2016.

== Lithology ==
The Luscar Group includes the conglomerate and quartzose sandstones of the Cadomin Formation at the base, and the overlying formations consist of variable amounts of sandstone, siltstone and mudstone. There are major coal seams in the Gates Formation, and minor coal, argillaceous limestone and calcareous shale in the Gladstone Formation. The Moosebar Formation consists primarily of mudstone and shale.

== Stratigraphy ==
The strata encompassed by the Luscar Group were originally included in the Blairmore Group. However, the Blairmore Group strata in the mountains and foothills of southwestern Alberta are of primarily nonmarine origin and are not coal-bearing, while those in the central and northern foothills include thick coal seams and a marine shale unit. Those strata were therefore reassigned to the Luscar Group.

The type section for the Luscar Group consists of outcrops along the railroad tracks near the town of Cadomin.

Luscar Group is subdivided into the following formations from top to base:

Formation	Age	Lithology	Max. thickness	Reference
Gates Formation	early Albian	sandstone, siltstone, mudstone, coal; minor conglomerate	345 m (1,130 ft)	
Moosebar Formation	early Albian	grey mudstone; minor siltstone	60 m (200 ft)	
Gladstone Formation	Aptian to Albian	fine-grained sandstone, siltstone mudstone; minor limestone and coal	115 m (380 ft)	
Cadomin Formation	Aptian	conglomerate, sandstone	45 m (150 ft)	

== Distribution and thickness ==
The name Luscar Group is applicable in the northern and north-central foothills of southwestern Alberta, from the Clearwater River north to the Kakwa River near the Alberta-British Columbia boundary. Its thickness is difficult to determine accurately due to folding and faulting that characterize the Alberta foothills, but is estimated to be about 145 m (480 ft) in the type area.

== Relationship to other units ==
The Luscar Group is correlative with the Blairmore Group of the southwestern Alberta foothills; with the Bullhead Group and the lower part of the Fort St. John Group of northeastern British Columbia; and with the Mannville Group of the Alberta plains. It disconformably overlies either the Nikanassin Formation or the Minnes Group, and is disconformably overlain by either the Shaftesbury Formation or Blackstone Formation, depending on the location.

== Environment of deposition and paleontology ==
The Luscar Group is an eastward-thinning wedge of clastic sediments derived from the erosion of newly uplifted mountains to the west. The sediments were transported eastward by river systems and deposited in a variety of braided stream, river channel, floodplain, swamp, coastal plain, marginal marine and shallow marine environments along the western edge of the Western Interior Seaway. Its formations include a variety of plant fossils, trace fossils, bivalves, and foraminifera.
