= Elk Formation =

Stratigraphic Unit in Western Canada

- Stratigraphic range: Late Jurassic to Early Cretaceous
- Type: Geological formation
- Unit of: Kootenay Group
- Underlies: Cadomin Formation
- Overlies: Mist Mountain Formation
- Thickness: Maximum 590 metres (1,940 ft)

Lithology
- Primary: Sandstone, conglomerate
- Other: Siltstone, mudstone, coal

Location
- Region: British Columbia; Alberta
- Country: Canada

Type section
- Named for: Elk River coal mine east of Fernie, British Columbia
- Named by: C.B. Newmarch, 1953

The Elk Formation is a stratigraphic unit of the Western Canada Sedimentary Basin that is present in southeastern British Columbia and southwestern Alberta. It is probably of Early Cretaceous age, but in some areas its strata could be as old as Late Jurassic. It includes minor thin coal beds and was named for outcrops near the now-abandoned Elk River coal mine east of Fernie, British Columbia.

== Lithology ==
The Elk Formation is a sequence of interbedded sandstone, siltstone, mudstone, shale, and chert-pebble or cobble conglomerate. Thin coal seams are present in some areas. Thick-bedded, cliff-forming sandstones and conglomerates are the most conspicuous lithologies. Most of the Elk Formation coals are of high-volatile bituminous rank and most seams are less than 60 centimetres (20 in) thick. An unusual type of coal, referred to as "needle coal" occurs in very thin beds in the upper third of the formation. It consists of compacted masses of rod-like "needles" and has been shown to be of algal origin. "Needles" of vitreous coal are also found in some of the siltstones associated with the needle coals.

== Environment of deposition ==
The Elk Formation is an eastward-thinning wedge of clastic sediments that were derived from mountains to the west, transported eastward by river systems, and deposited in alluvial plain environments. These include river channel, crevasse splay, overbank, and marsh environments. Conglomeratic units may represent alluvial fan and braided river deposits.

== Paleontology and age ==
The Elk Formation contains plant fossils, palynomorphs, bivalves, ostracodes, and ichnofossils, but none of these fossils are sufficiently time-sensitive to date the strata precisely. Palynomorph evidence suggests that the Elk Formation is mainly of Early Cretaceous age, but could be as old as Late Jurassic in some areas.

== Thickness and distribution ==
The Elk Formation is present in the Rocky Mountain Front and foothills of the Canadian Rockies in southeastern British Columbia and southwestern Alberta. It can be traced from Flathead Ridge south of Fernie to Barrier Mountain near the Red Deer River in the foothills of western Alberta. Measured thicknesses range from a maximum of 590 metres (1,940 ft) at Mount Allan in Alberta to 28 metres (90 ft) north of Coleman, Alberta. Farther to the east it was truncated by pre-Aptian erosion.

== Relationship to other units ==
The Elk Formation is the uppermost unit of the Kootenay Group. It gradationally and conformably overlies the Mist Mountain Formation. It is disconformably overlain by the Cadomin Formation and to the east it was truncated by pre-Cadomin erosion. To the north Elk strata may correlate with part of the Nikanassin Formation. Correlation to the south in Montana has not been established, but it has been suggested that equivalent strata maybe absent due to erosion and/or nondeposition.
