= Blairmorite =

Rare porphyritic volcanic rock

- Extrusive igneous rock
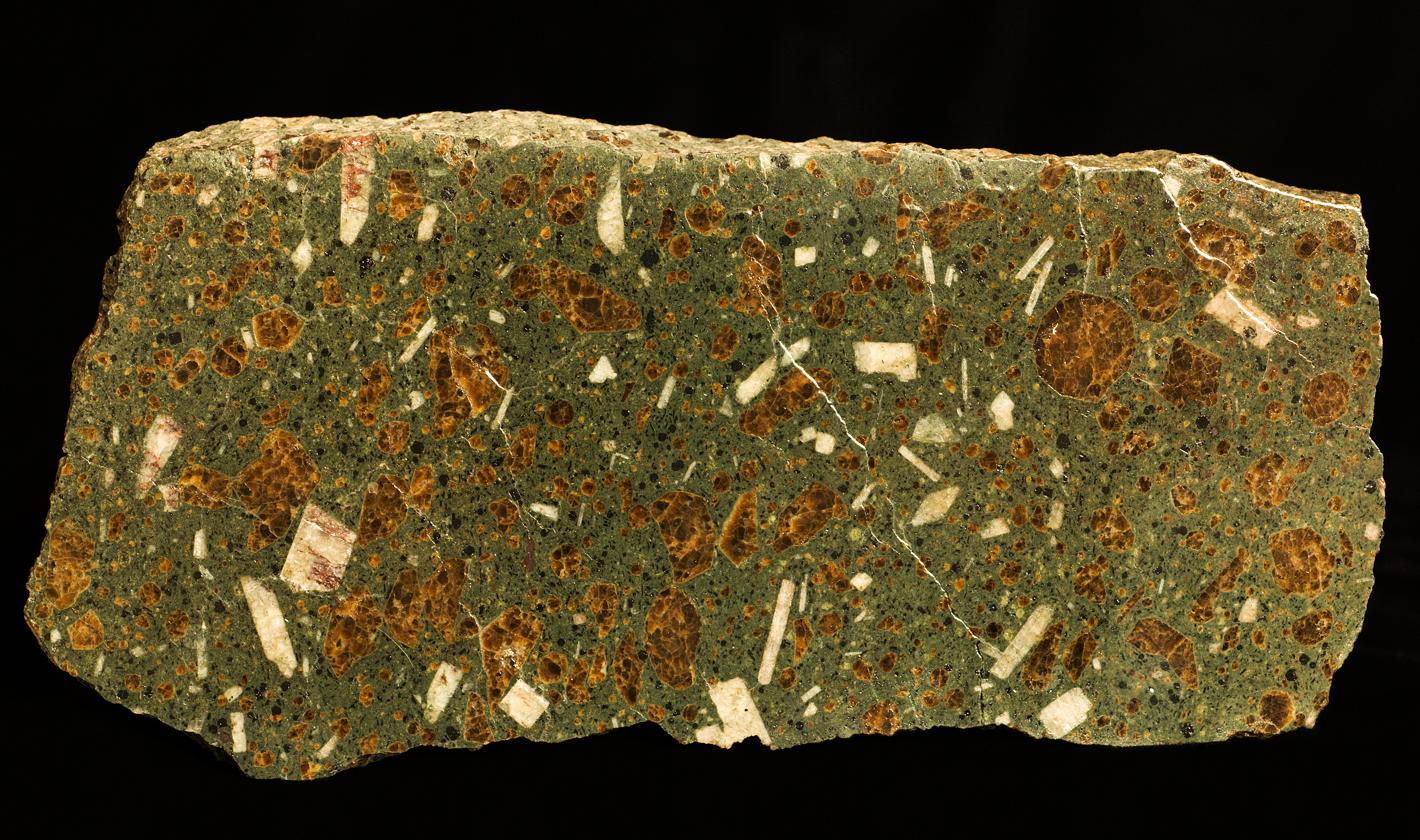
- A specimen of blairmorite from the Crowsnest Formation. The amber mineral is analcime, the pale mineral is sanidine and the small black minerals are melanite garnet.

Composition
- Primary: Analcime, sanidine, pyroxene
- Secondary: Titanite, melanite, nepheline

Blairmorite is a very rare porphyritic volcanic rock named after the community of Blairmore in southwestern Alberta, Canada. It is characterized by dominant analcime phenocrysts in a matrix of analcime and aegirine-augite with accessory melanite, nepheline and sanidine. Blairmorite has been described as a leucocratic variety of analcimite (a foidite) or as an analcime-rich variety of phonolite.

This extrusive igneous rock is known from only two geological formations worldwide. The foremost blairmorite occurrence is the Crowsnest Formation in the Canadian province of Alberta where it is associated with agglomerates and tuffs from explosive eruptions. The other locality is the Lupata Gorge in Mozambique.
