= Blairmore Group =

Geologic unit of Early Cretaceous age in the Western Canada Sedimentary Basin

- Stratigraphic range: Early Cretaceous
- Type: Group
- Sub-units: Cadomin Formation, Gladstone Formation, Beaver Mines Formation, Ma Butte Formation
- Underlies: Crowsnest Formation, Alberta Group
- Overlies: Kootenay Group
- Thickness: up to 2,000 m (6,560 ft)

Lithology
- Primary: Sandstone, siltstone, mudstone
- Other: Conglomerate, limestone

Location
- Region: Alberta, British Columbia
- Country: Canada

Type section
- Named for: Blairmore, Alberta
- Named by: W.W. Leach, 1914

The Blairmore Group, originally named the Blairmore Formation, is a geologic unit of Early Cretaceous age in the Western Canada Sedimentary Basin that is present in southwestern Alberta and southeastern British Columbia. It is subdivided into four formations: Cadomin Formation, Gladstone, Beaver Mines and Ma Butte, all of which are defined by type sections, most of which contain plant fossils. In some areas the Blairmore contains significant reservoirs of natural gas.

== Lithology ==
The Blairmore group includes the conglomerate and quartzose sandstones of the Cadomin Formation at the base, and grades to sandstone, siltstone, mudstone, and limestone in the overlying formations.

The Cadomin Formation has beds of quartzose sandstone and, in some sections, especially in the eastern foothills, is totally quartzose sandstone. It is normally a very durable, siliceous pebble conglomerate. A sequence of interbedded, highly variable-proportioned grey mudstone to sandstone layers makes up the bottom portion of the underlying Gladstone Formation. Sandstones, whose grain size rarely exceeds fine, frequently show a noticeable upward decline in grain size. Dark grey, argillaceous limestone and fossiliferous calcareous shale make up the top Gladstone Formation. Limestone deposits are few or nonexistent north of the Clearwater River (52°N).

Both the Beaver Mines Formation in the south and the Mountain Park Formation in the north are made up of interbedded mudstone to very fine-grained sandstone with minor but noticeable thicker and coarser sandstone units that have abrupt bases and fining upward grain size. Conglomerate beds make up a small portion. The marine mudstone Moosebar Member of the Malcolm Creek Formation, which is restricted to the region north of Waiparous Creek (51°20'N), is overlain by the notable sandstone-dominated Torrens Member and the coal-bearing Grande Cache Member. Mudstone to very fine-grained sandstone, as well as layers of conglomerate and coarser sandstone, make up the Ma Butte Formation.

The Beaver Mines and Ma Butte formations in the upper part of the group also include minor beds of bentonite and tuff.

In the type area, tuffaceous mudstones are widespread in the top portion of the formation, but they vanish to the northwest along the foothills. North of the Clearwater River, the structure is completely missing. Various shades of red and green, frequently speckled south of the Bow River, are particularly prevalent. Except in the Mountain Park Formation, where greenish grey predominates in more southerly areas and is increasingly prominent higher, grey prevails to the north. In the Smoky River region, the uppermost part of the formation, the proportion of the section with a conspicuously greenish tint is restricted to a subtle shade of greenish-grey as it declines northward.

== Stratigraphy ==
The Blairmore Group is subdivided into the following formations from top to base:

Formation	Age	Lithology	Max thickness	Reference
Ma Butte Formation	Early Cretaceous	mudstone, siltstone, very fine-grained sandstone, bentonite and tuff	120 m (390 ft)	
Beaver Mines Formation	Early Cretaceous	greenish grey sandstone and mudstone; minor conglomerate, bentonite and tuff	455 m (1,490 ft)	
Gladstone Formation	Early Cretaceous	argillaceous limestone and calcareous shale	180 m (590 ft)	
Cadomin Formation	Early Cretaceous	conglomerate, sandstone	170 m (560 ft)	

Some early workers included the Crowsnest Formation, which overlies the Ma Butte Formation, at the top of the Blairmore Group, but that practice has been abandoned.

== Distribution and thickness ==
The name Blairmore Group is applicable in the foothills and mountains of southwestern Alberta and southeastern British Columbia, from the Canada–United States border northward to the Clearwater River. The equivalent strata north of the Clearwater River, which were originally assigned to the Blairmore Group, differ in that they contain major coal deposits and they have therefore been reassigned to the Luscar Group.

The Blairmore Group has a maximum thickness of about 2,000 m (6,560 ft). The Ma Butte portion has a thickness of 635 m (2,080 ft) The Fernie Basin's maximum reported thickness is estimated to be 2,000 m (6,560 ft). The easternmost foothills have reported thicknesses of roughly 300 m (980 ft), indicating a clear west to east thinning. In the northwest, thicknesses of 400 to 600 m (1312 to 1968 ft) are common in the foothills.

== Relationship to other units ==
The Blairmore Group unconformably overlies the Kootenay Group and is gradationally overlain by the Crowsnest Formation or, where the Crowsnest Formation is absent, is disconformably overlain by the Alberta Group. It is equivalent to the Luscar Group north of the Clearwater River and to the Mannville Group in the plains to the east.

In northwestern Montana the Cut Bank Sandstone correlates with the Cadomin Formation; the lower Kootenai Formation, including the Draney Limestone with the Beaver Mines Formation; and the lower Blackleaf Formation with the Ma Butte Formation.

== Environment of deposition and paleontology ==
The Blairmore Group is a westward-thickening clastic wedge of clastic sediments derived from the erosion of newly uplifted mountains to the west. The sediments were transported eastward by river systems and deposited in a variety of braided stream, river channel, floodplain, and coastal plain environments along the western edge of the Western Interior Seaway. Its formations include a variety of plant fossils, trace fossils, bivalves, and microfossils.

== See also ==
- Various Contributors to the Paleobiology Database. "Fossilworks: Gateway to the Paleobiology Database".
- List of fossiliferous stratigraphic units in Alberta
