= Monach Formation =

Stratigraphic unit in Canada

- Stratigraphic range: Valanginian
- Type: Formation
- Unit of: Minnes Group
- Underlies: Bickford Formation
- Overlies: Beattie Peaks Formation
- Thickness: maximum 350 m (1,150 ft)

Lithology
- Primary: Sandstone
- Other: Siltstone, mudstone, coal

Location
- Coordinates: 55.8500°N 122.5°W
- Region: British Columbia
- Country: Canada
- Extent: Western Canadian Sedimentary Basin

Type section
- Named for: The Monach
- Named by: W.H. Mathews, 1947
- Monach Formation (Canada)

The Monach Formation is a geologic formation of Early Cretaceous (Valanginian) age in the Western Canada Sedimentary Basin that consists primarily of sandstone. It is present in the northern foothills of the Canadian Rockies and the adjacent plains in northeastern British Columbia.

== Lithology ==
The Monach Formation consists primarily of clean, white to light grey, well sorted, medium- to coarse-grained quartzose sandstone, and grey to brown, thin bedded to finely laminated argillaceous sandstone, with lesser interbeds of dark grey mudstone, thin coal seams, carbonaceous shale, and rare conglomerate.

== Environment of deposition ==
The Monach Formation was deposited in marine and nonmarine environments within and adjacent to the Western Interior Seaway. Depositional settings ranged from marine to shoreline, deltaic, river channel, floodplain, and swamp environments.

== Paleontology and age ==
The age of the Monach Formation has been determined from its fossil fauna, primarily species of the bivalve Buchia.

== Thickness and distribution ==
The Monach Formation is present in the foothills of the Canadian Rockies and the adjacent plains in northeastern British Columbia. It extends from the Chowade River in the north, to south of the Sukunka River where it grades into the Gorman Creek Formation. It attains a maximum thickness of 350 m (1,150 ft) in the foothills, and thins to zero about 80 km (50 mi) or less beyond the eastern edge of the foothills where it was removed by erosion prior to the deposition of the Cadomin Formation.

== Relationship to other units ==
The Monach Formation is part of the Minnes Group. It was deposited conformably on the Beattie Peaks Formation and is conformably overlain by the Bickford Formation, both of which also belong to the Minnes Group. To the east where it was removed by erosion, the Monach Formation is unconformably overlain by the Cadomin Formation. To the south it grades into the Gorman Creek Formation.

== See also ==
- List of fossiliferous stratigraphic units in British Columbia
- Various Contributors to the Paleobiology Database. "Fossilworks: Gateway to the Paleobiology Database".
