= Mist Mountain Formation =

Geologic group in Canada

- Stratigraphic range: Late Jurassic to Early Cretaceous
- Type: Geological formation
- Unit of: Kootenay Group
- Underlies: Elk & Cadomin Formations
- Overlies: Morrissey Formation
- Thickness: up to 665 metres (2,180 ft)

Lithology
- Primary: Sandstone, siltstone, mudstone
- Other: Coal, conglomerate

Location
- Coordinates: 50.1°N 115.0°W
- Approximate paleocoordinates: 47.6°N 59.0°W
- Region: Canadian Rockies
- Country: Canada

Type section
- Named for: Mist Mountain, Alberta
- Named by: D.W. Gibson
- Year defined: 1979
- Mist Mountain Formation (Canada) Mist Mountain Formation (British Columbia)

The Mist Mountain Formation is a geologic formation of latest Jurassic to earliest Cretaceous age in the Western Canada Sedimentary Basin that is present in the southern and central Canadian Rockies. It was named for outcrops along the western spur of Mist Mountain in Alberta by D.W. Gibson in 1979. The Mist Mountain Formation contains economically important coal seams that have been mined in southeastern British Columbia and southwestern Alberta.

== Lithology ==
The Mist Mountain Formation consists of interbedded light to dark grey siltstone, silty shale, mudstone, and sandstone, with localized occurrences of chert- and quartzite-pebble conglomerate and conglomeratic sandstone, as well as a series of economically important coal seams.

== Environment of deposition ==
The Mist Mountain Formation is part of the Kootenay Group, an eastward-thinning wedge of sediments derived from the erosion of newly uplifted mountains to the west. The sediments were transported eastward by river systems and deposited in a variety of fluvial channel, floodplain, swamp, coastal plain and deltaic environments along the western edge of the Western Interior Seaway.

== Thickness and distribution ==
The Mist Mountain Formation is present in the front ranges and foothills of the southern and central Canadian Rockies. It extends from the Canada–US border to north of the North Saskatchewan River. It thins eastward, ranging from 665 metres (2,180 ft) thick near Elkford, British Columbia, to less than 25 metres (80 ft) in the eastern foothills in Alberta. Farther to the east it was truncated by pre-Aptian erosion.

== Relationship to other units ==
The Mist Mountain Formation is the middle unit of the Kootenay Group. It rests conformably on the cliff-forming sandstones of the Moose Mountain Member of the Morrissey Formation, and is conformably overlain by the Elk Formation. In the eastern foothills, the Elk Formation has been removed by erosion and the Mist Mountain Formation is unconformably overlain by the Cadomin Formation. North of the North Saskatchewan River, the Mist Mountain Formation grades into the Nikanassin Formation. Correlation south of the Canada–United States border is uncertain.

== Paleontology and age ==
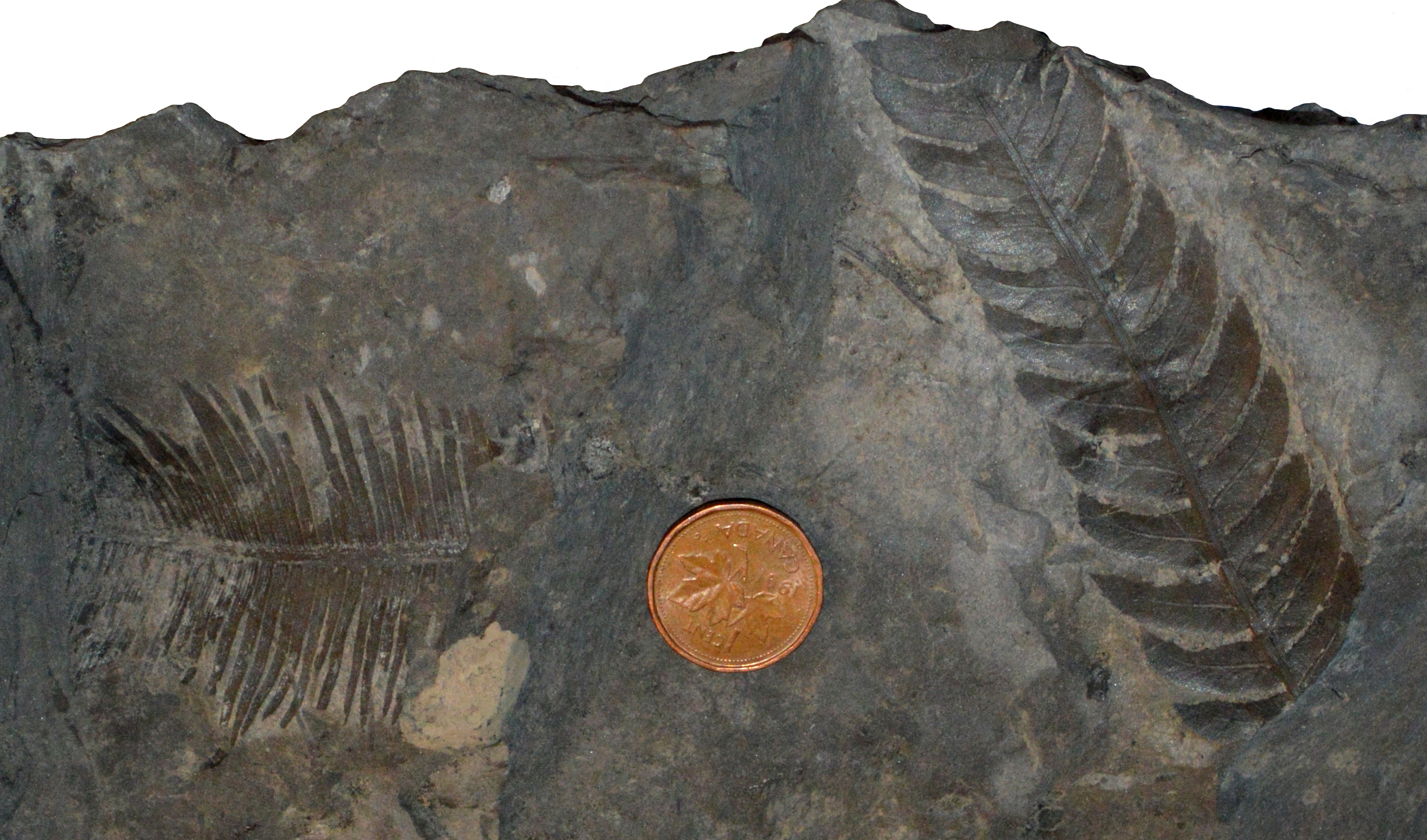
Fossilized leaves of a cycadophyte (left) and a fern (right) from the Mist Mountain Formation at an open-pit coal mine near Sparwood.

Plant fossils from the Mist Mountain Formation include remains of ferns, cycads, cycadeoids, ginkgos, and extinct conifers. No remains of flowering plants have been reported. Indeterminate fossil ornithischian tracks are also known from the formation. None of the fossils are sufficiently time-sensitive to date the formation precisely.

== Coal resources ==
Economically important coal seams in the Mist Mountain Formation reach a maximum thickness of 18 metres (60 ft). Seams occur throughout the formation, and some of the seams near the base for the formation are regionally extensive.

The formation was strongly folded and faulted during the Laramide Orogeny, which brought the coal to surface in many places. This also produced localized thickening and thinning of the coal in some areas due to shearing and fault-repetition of the seams, especially in the cores of folds and flexures. A seam was thickened to 25 metres (80 ft) in the core of an anticline at Grassy Mountain near Blairmore, Alberta, and extreme thickening to 120 metres (390 ft) occurred in a faulted syncline at Corbin, British Columbia.

Mist Mountain coal generally has a low sulphur content and coal rank typically ranges from high- to medium-volatile bituminous in the south, and from low-volatile bituminous to semi-anthracite in the north. As of 2019, it is being produced from large open-pit mines near Sparwood and Elkford, British Columbia, and the majority of it is exported to international markets for use as coking coal. Mist Mountain coal was formerly mined in British Columbia near Fernie, Hosmer, and Corbin; at several locations in the Crowsnest Pass area of Alberta; and at Canmore, Alberta, in many cases by underground mining methods.

== See also ==
- List of dinosaur-bearing rock formations
  - List of stratigraphic units with ornithischian tracks
    - Indeterminate ornithischian tracks
