= Corbin, British Columbia =

Ghost town in British Columbia, Canada

Coordinates: 49°31′N 114°39′W

Corbin is a ghost town in British Columbia, Canada. It was a coal mining community located at the foot of Coal Mountain (elev. 6835 feet; 2083 metres), south of the Crowsnest Pass in the southern Canadian Rockies.

Daniel Chase Corbin, president of Nelson and Fort Sheppard Railway, founded Corbin in 1905. Three years after later he saw a very thick seam of bituminous coal exposed at the base of Coal Mountain & founded Coal and Coke Company. The town was built at an elevation of 5060 feet (1542 metres), and at one time it boasted a population of 600. It had its own railway, a company store, and a hotel, but it was isolated. No roads connected it to the outside, and there was no electricity or plumbing. Winters were harsh and living conditions were poor. The workers unionized in 1910.

Between 1905 and 1935 the coal at Corbin was worked at a succession of six mines, of which five were underground mines (the No. 1, 2, 4, 5, and 6 Mines) and one (the No. 3 Mine) was an open pit. Two seams, called the Mammoth Seam and the Upper Seam, were worked. They lay in complexly folded and faulted strata of the Mist Mountain Formation in the Kootenay Group. Due to the structural complexity, the seam thicknesses were quite variable, with the Mammoth Seam reaching a maximum of about 450 feet (137 metres). Most of the coal mined at that time was sold to the Canadian Pacific Railway, commercial centers in Washington and Oregon, and copper mines in south-central British Columbia.

A major strike that began in January of 1935 turned violent in April. The mine closed on May 7 and the town was abandoned.

The mine was operated by a different company for a few years during World War II to supply the smelter at Trail, but most of the workers traveled from elsewhere in the region and the town was not revived.

Byron Creek Collieries opened a large open-pit mine at Corbin in 1972, but again most of the workers traveled from elsewhere. The mine was bought and sold several times until it was acquired by Teck Resources Ltd. in 2008, at which time it became known as the Coal Mountain Operations. Its coal reserves were mined out by the end of 2018, and work transitioned to mine reclamation activities. The old townsite remains popular for camping and outdoor recreation.
