= Bickford Formation =

Stratigraphic unit in Canada

- Stratigraphic range: Valanginian
- Type: Formation
- Unit of: Minnes Group
- Underlies: Cadomin Formation
- Overlies: Monach Formation
- Thickness: maximum 400 m (1,310 ft)

Lithology
- Primary: Sandstone
- Other: Siltstone, mudstone, coal

Location
- Coordinates: 56.6166°N 122.4333°W
- Region: British Columbia
- Country: Canada
- Extent: Western Canadian Sedimentary Basin

Type section
- Named for: Mount Bickford
- Named by: D.F. Stott, 1981
- Bickford Formation (Canada)

The Bickford Formation is a geologic formation of Early Cretaceous (Valanginian) age in the Western Canada Sedimentary Basin that consists primarily of nonmarine sediments. It is present in the northern foothills of the Canadian Rockies in northeastern British Columbia.

== Lithology ==
The Bickford Formation consists of carbonaceous mudstone, shale, siltstone, sandstone, and thin coal seams. The sandstones are typically fine-grained, brown, finely laminated, cross-bedded, and thin bedded to flaggy. Some are extremely finely laminated, black, carbonaceous, limonitic, and weather to an orange-brown color. The interbedded shales and mudstones are dark olive brown to black and commonly carbonaceous. Coal seams are typically thin, although some may reach thicknesses of a few meters locally.

== Environment of deposition ==
The Bickford Formation was deposited in nonmarine environments adjacent to the Western Interior Seaway. Depositional settings include deltaic, coastal plain, floodplain, and swamp environments.

== Paleontology ==
Species of the bivalve Buchia and a variety of palynomorphs and microfossils have been described from the Bickford Creek Formation.

== Thickness and distribution ==
The Bickford Formation is present in the foothills of the Canadian Rockies in northeastern British Columbia. It extends from the Halfway River in the north to the Sukunka River in the south where it grades into the Gorman Creek Formation. It reaches a maximum thickness of about 400 m (1,310 ft) in the foothills between the Peace and Pine rivers, and thins to toward the east where it was eroded prior to the deposition of theoverlying Cadomin Formation.

== Relationship to other units ==
The Bickford Formation forms the upper part of the Minnes Group. It conformably overlies the Monach Formation and is unconformably overlain by the Cadomin Formation. To the south it grades into the upper part of the Gorman Creek Formation. Equivalent beds are not present in the plains to the east.

== See also ==
- List of fossiliferous stratigraphic units in British Columbia
- Various Contributors to the Paleobiology Database. "Fossilworks: Gateway to the Paleobiology Database". Archived from the original on 25 March 2022.
