= Gladstone Formation =

Stratigraphic unit in Canada

- Stratigraphic range: Early Cretaceous (Aptian)
- Type: Geological formation
- Unit of: Blairmore Group, Luscar Group
- Underlies: Beaver Mines Formation, Moosebar Formation
- Overlies: Cadomin Formation
- Thickness: up to about 180 metres (590 ft)

Lithology
- Primary: Sandstone, siltstone, mudstone
- Other: Limestone, coal

Location
- Region: Alberta
- Country: Canada

Type section
- Named for: Gladstone Creek
- Named by: J.R. McLean

The Gladstone Formation is a stratigraphic unit of Early Cretaceous (Aptian) age in the Western Canada Sedimentary Basin. It is present in the foothills of southwestern Alberta and is named for outcrops along Gladstone Creek, a tributary of the Castle River south of the Crowsnest Pass.

== Stratigraphy and lithology ==
The Gladstone Formation is a unit of the Blairmore and Luscar Groups. The lower portion of the formation consists of fine-grained sandstone interbedded with siltstone, mudstone and claystone. The upper portion consists of limestone beds and coquinas of fresh water shells, interbedded with calcareous mudstone, siltstone and fine-grained sandstone. Thin coal beds are present in northern areas.

== Thickness and distribution ==
The Gladstone Formation is present in the foothills of southwestern Alberta from the Gladstone Creek area south of the Crowsnest Pass, northward to the Kakwa River area. It has a maximum reported thickness of about 180 metres (590 ft) north of the North Saskatchewan River.

== Environment of deposition and paleontology ==
The Gladstone sediments were derived from erosion of mountain ranges to the west, transported eastward by river systems, and deposited in a variety of floodplain environments. They contain a fossil fauna of mainly fresh water bivalves, gastropods, ostracods, and charophytes.

== Relationship to other units ==
The Gladstone Formation rests conformably on the Cadomin Formation. It is overlain by the Beaver Mines Formation in the south, and by the Moosebar Formation in the north. It is equivalent to the Gething Formation of northeastern British Columbia. The upper calcareous portion is equivalent to the Ostracod Beds of the Alberta plains.
