= Ma Butte Formation =

Stratigraphic unit in Canada

- Stratigraphic range: Early Cretaceous (Albian)
- Type: Geological formation
- Unit of: Blairmore Group
- Underlies: Crowsnest Formation
- Overlies: Beaver Mines Formation
- Thickness: up to 132 metres (430 ft)

Lithology
- Primary: Sandstone, siltstone, mudstone
- Other: Conglomerate, bentonite, tuff

Location
- Region: Alberta
- Country: Canada

Type section
- Named for: Ma Butte
- Named by: J.R. McLean
- Year defined: 1980

The Ma Butte Formation is a stratigraphic unit of Early Cretaceous (Albian) age in the Western Canada Sedimentary Basin. It was named for Ma Butte, a mountain north of Coleman, Alberta, by J.R. McLean in 1980. It is present in the foothills of southwestern Alberta and it contains plant fossils.

== Stratigraphy and lithology ==
The Ma Butte Formation is a unit of the Blairmore Group. It consists primarily of fine-grained sandstones interbedded with siltstones and mudstones. Some coarser grained sandstones and conglomerate beds are also present. Beds of bentonite and tuff increase upward toward the contact with the overlying Crowsnest Formation. The sandstones of the Ma Butte Formation are quartzose, in contrast with the feldspathic sandstones of the underlying Beaver Mines Formation.

== Distribution and thickness ==
The Ma Butte Formation is present in the southern foothills of Alberta as far north as the Red Deer River. It has a maximum reported thickness of 132 metres (430 ft) near the Bow River.

== Depositional environment and paleontology ==
The sediments of the Ma Butte Formation were derived from erosion of mountain ranges to the west, transported eastward by river systems, and deposited in a variety of floodplain environments. They include angiosperm (flowering plant) fossils, in contrast to the underlying Beaver Mines Formation. This marks the first appearance of angiosperms in this area.

== Relationship to other units ==
The Ma Butte Formation is also known as the Mill Creek Formation. It disconformably overlies the Beaver Mines Formation. It is conformably overlain by the Crowsnest Formation in the south and the contact between the two is gradational. It is disconformably overlain by the Blackstone Formation in the north, and it is correlative with the Bow Island Formation to the east.
