= Crowsnest Formation =

Geologic formation in Alberta, Canada

- Stratigraphic range: Mid to Upper Albian
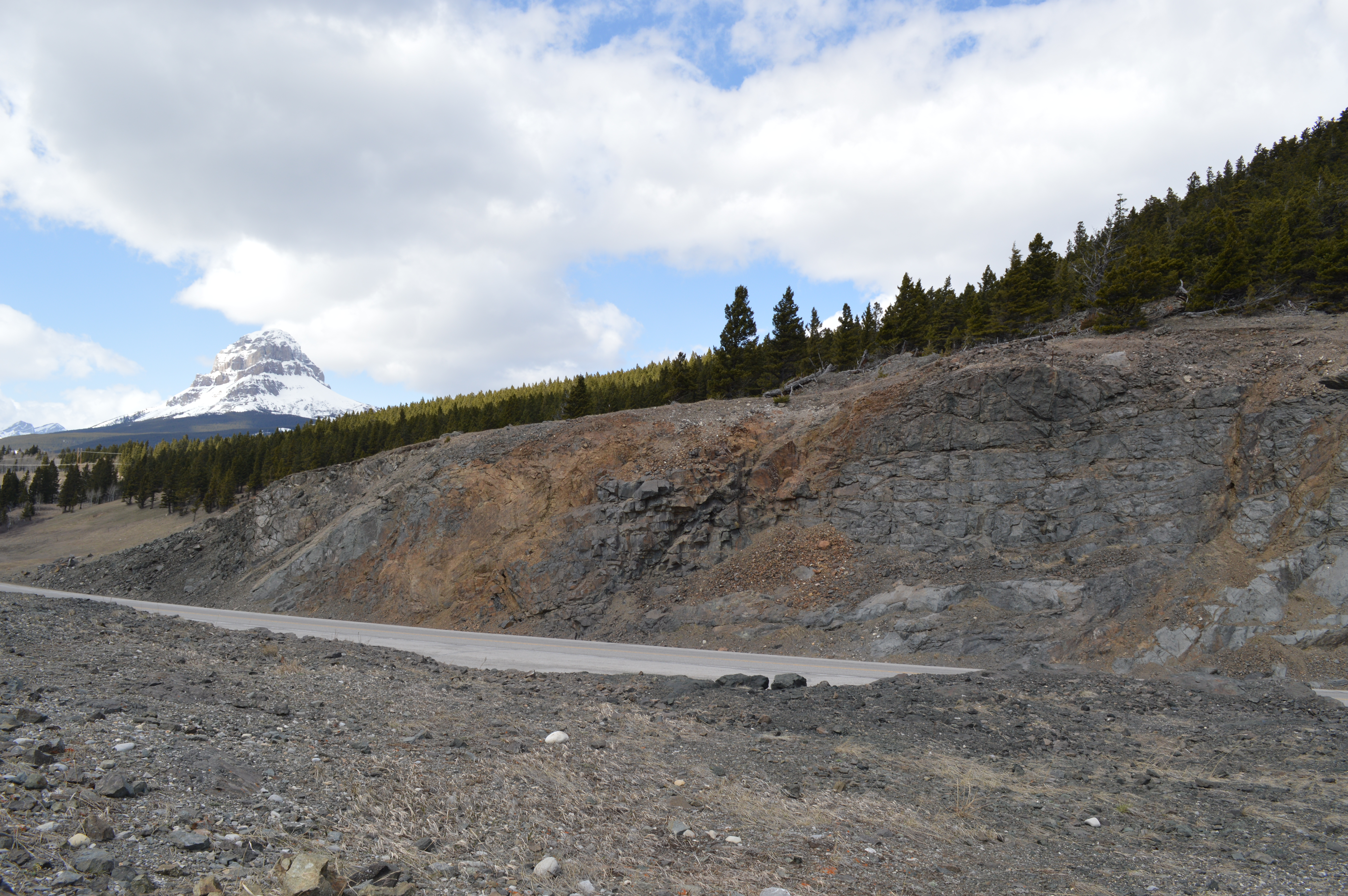
- The west end of the type section of the Crowsnest Formation, on the Crowsnest Highway west of Coleman, Alberta.
- Type: Geological formation
- Unit of: Blairmore Group
- Underlies: Blackstone Formation
- Overlies: Ma Butte Formation
- Thickness: Up to 488 metres (1,600 ft)

Lithology
- Primary: Volcanic rocks, pyroclastic breccia
- Other: Sandstone

Location
- Coordinates: 49°38′51″N 114°31′48″W
- Region: Alberta
- Country: Canada
- Extent: Western Canadian Sedimentary Basin

Type section
- Named for: Crowsnest Pass
- Named by: G.M. Dawson
- Crowsnest Formation (Canada)

The Crowsnest Formation, also called the Crowsnest Volcanics, is a geological formation in southwestern Alberta, Canada, on the southwestern margin of the Western Canada Sedimentary Basin. It was named for the Crowsnest Pass near Coleman, Alberta. The formation consists mostly of pyroclastic rocks that were laid down in a series of explosive eruptions about 100 million years ago during the Albian stage of the Early Cretaceous epoch. It contains unusual minerals such as melanite (a variety of andradite garnet) and analcime (a variety of zeolite).

== Lithology and mineralogy ==
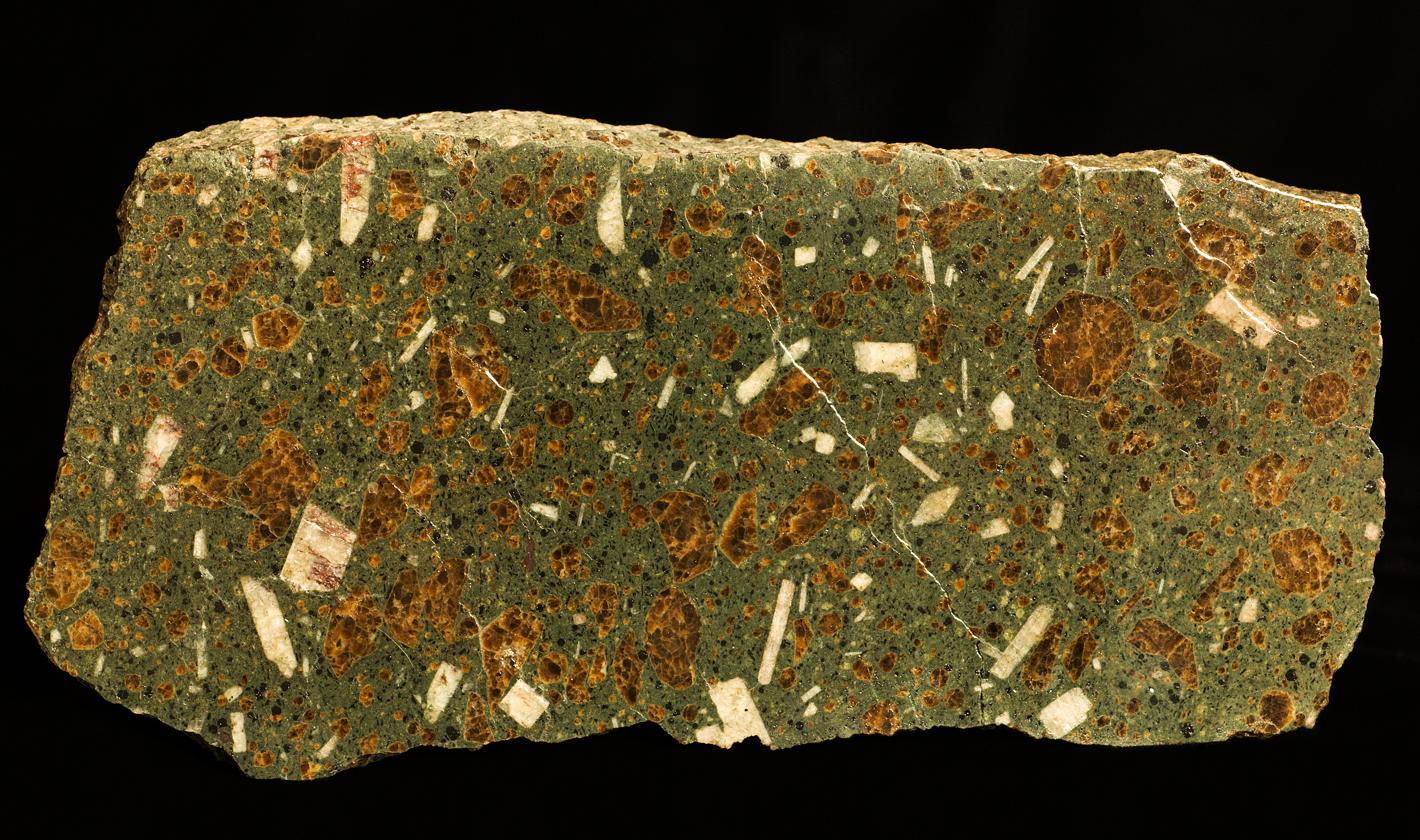
Blairmorite from the Crowsnest Formation. The amber mineral is analcime, the pale mineral is sanidine, and the small black minerals are melanite garnet. The specimen is about 17 cm (6.7 in) in length. Photo by P. Glombick, courtesy of Alberta Geological Survey.

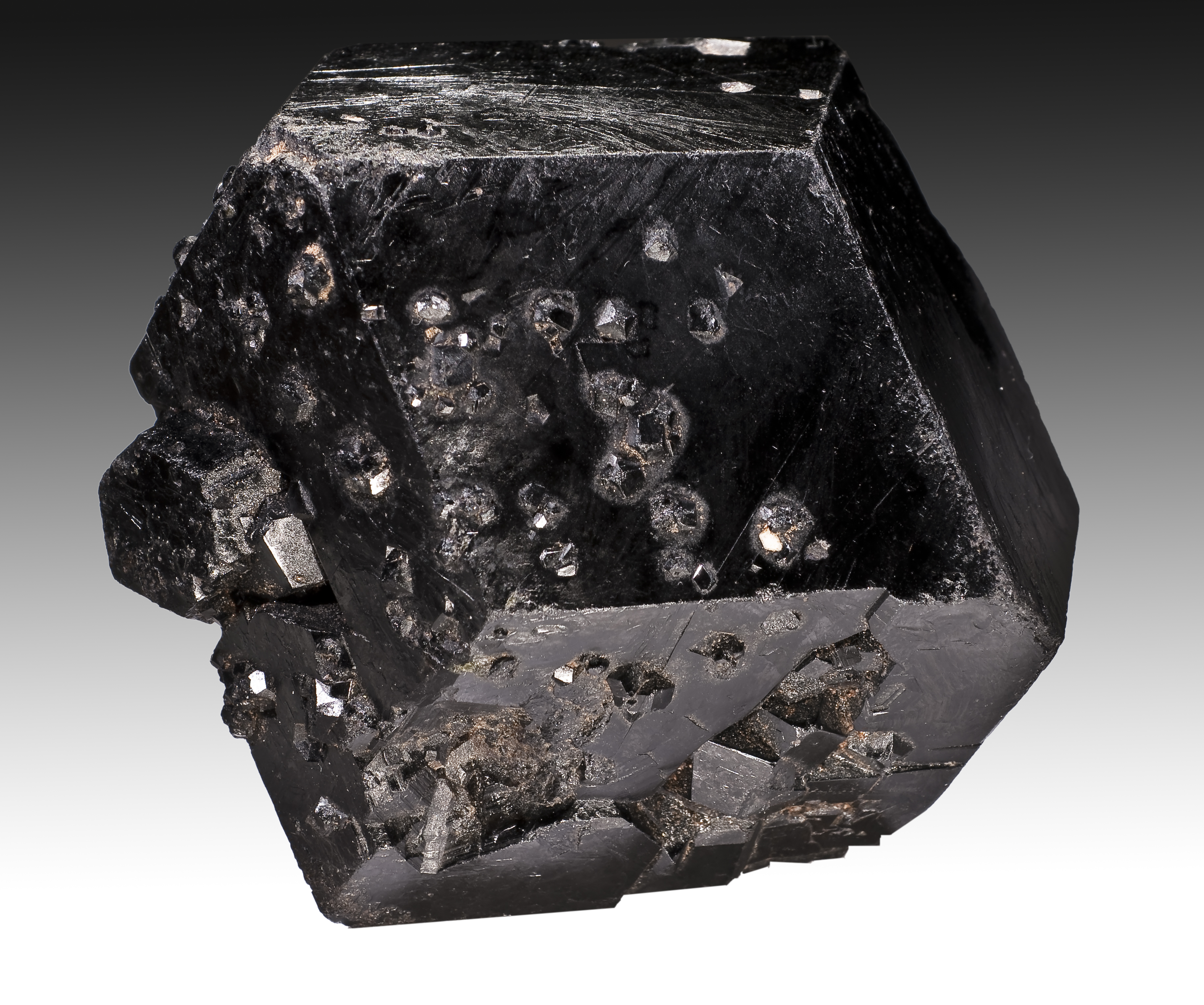
Crystals of melanite, a variety of andradite garnet.

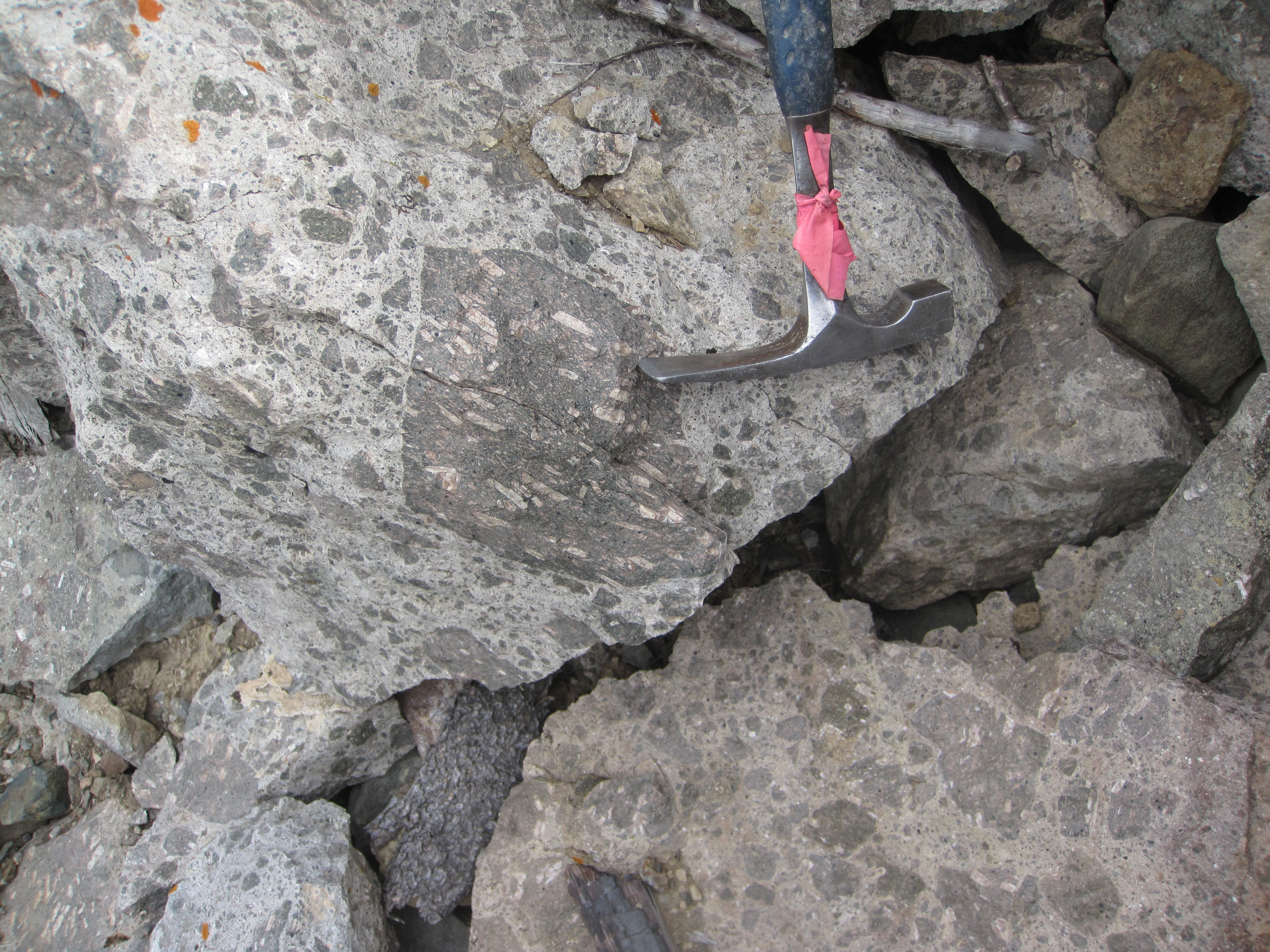
Pyroclastic rocks of the Crowsnest Formation. Photo by C.W. Langenberg, courtesy of Alberta Geological Survey.

The formation contains pyroclastic flows, lahars, agglomerates, tuffs and ash-fall deposits, as well as volcanic-rich sandstones and other sediments. The whole-rock chemistry of the volcanics is relatively normal, ranging from trachyandesite (latite) to phonolite and trachyte, but the mineralogy is unusual. In addition to analcime and melanite, common minerals include sanidine, aegerine-augite and chlorite. Blairmorite, a rare analcime-rich rock-type named for the town of Blairmore, Alberta, is known only from the Crowsnest Formation and a locality in Mozambique.

== Stratigraphy ==
The Crowsnest Formation is the uppermost unit of the Blairmore Group. Exposures along the Crowsnest Highway (Highway 3) and the railroad west of Coleman are the type locality. It is underlain by the Ma Butte Formation (also known as the Mill Creek Formation). The contact is gradational, with volcanic fragments becoming progressively more common toward the top of the Ma Butte Formation. The lower part of the formation is trachytic with abundant sanidine phenocrysts, melanite and pyroxene. The upper part contains sanidine, analcime, melanite and rock fragments. It is unconformably overlain by the shales of the Blackstone Formation that were deposited during a marine transgression in the Late Cretaceous.

== Deposition ==
The volcanics were laid down on an inland floodplain that is represented by the underlying Ma Butte Formation. The eruptions probably occurred to the west near what is now Cranbrook, British Columbia, and the material was subsequently moved eastward by thrust faulting during the Laramide orogeny. It's estimated that the volcanics originally covered an area of about 1,800 km^{2} (690 mi^{2}), and their volume is estimated at 209 km^{3} (50 mi^{3}).

== Thickness and distribution ==
The Crowsnest Volcanics are exposed along a series of folded, west-dipping fault plates in the Front Ranges and foothills of the southern Canadian Rockies. They reach maximum thicknesses of 426 to 488 metres (1,400 to 1,600 ft) along a trend that extends northward from Coleman along McGillivray Ridge to Ma Butte.

== See also ==
- Volcanism of Western Canada
- Geology of Alberta
