= Beattie Peaks Formation =

Geologic formation in the Western Canada Sedimentary Basin

- Stratigraphic range: Valanginian
- Type: Formation
- Unit of: Minnes Group
- Underlies: Monach Formation
- Overlies: Monteith Formation
- Thickness: maximum 460 m (1,510 ft)

Lithology
- Primary: Mudstone
- Other: Siltstone, sandstone

Location
- Coordinates: 53.7833°N 122.5833°W
- Region: British Columbia
- Country: Canada
- Extent: Western Canadian Sedimentary Basin

Type section
- Named for: Beattie Peaks
- Named by: W.H. Mathews
- Year defined: 1947
- Beattie Peaks Formation (Canada) Beattie Peaks Formation (British Columbia)

The Beattie Peaks Formation is a geologic formation of Early Cretaceous (Valanginian) age in the Western Canada Sedimentary Basin that consists primarily of marine mudstone. It is present in the northern foothills of the Canadian Rockies and the adjacent plains in northeastern British Columbia.

== Lithology ==
The Beattie Peaks Formation consists primarily of dark grey to brownish grey or black mudstones that contain abundant organic matter and are extensively burrowed. Interbeds of argillaceous siltstone and fine-grained sandstone increase toward the top of the formation.

== Environment of deposition ==
The Beattie Peaks Formation was deposited in marine and prodeltaic environments within the Western Interior Seaway.

== Paleontology and age ==
The age of the Beattie Peaks Formation has been determined from its fossil fauna, primarily species of the bivalve Buchia. The formation has also yielded other fossil bivalves, ammonites, and microfossils. Trace fossils made by burrowing organisms are common in its mudstones.

== Thickness and distribution ==
The Beattie Peaks Formation is present in the foothills of the Canadian Rockies and the adjacent plains in northeastern British Columbia, extending from the Prophet River to south of the Pine River. It reaches a maximum thickness of 460 m (1,510 ft) in the western foothills and thins eastward.

== Relationship to other units ==
The Beattie Peaks Formation is part of the Minnes Group. It was deposited conformably on the Monteith Formation and is conformably overlain by the Monach Formation, both of which also belong to the Minnes Group. To the south it grades into the lower part of the Gorman Creek Formation.

== See also ==
- Various Contributors to the Paleobiology Database. "Fossilworks: Gateway to the Paleobiology Database". Archived from the original on 25 March 2022.
- List of fossiliferous stratigraphic units in British Columbia
