= Monteith Formation =

Sandstone formation in Western Canada

- Stratigraphic range: Valanginian
- Type: Formation
- Unit of: Minnes Group
- Underlies: Beattie Peaks Formation
- Overlies: Fernie Formation
- Thickness: maximum 600 m (1,970 ft)

Lithology
- Primary: Sandstone
- Other: Siltstone, mudstone, coal

Location
- Coordinates: 55.7833°N 122.5833°W
- Region: British Columbia; Alberta
- Country: Canada
- Extent: Western Canadian Sedimentary Basin

Type section
- Named for: Mount Monteith
- Named by: W.H. Mathews, 1947
- Monteith Formation (Canada)

The Monteith Formation is a geologic formation of Early Cretaceous (Valanginian) age in the Western Canada Sedimentary Basin that consists primarily of sandstone. It is present in the northern foothills of the Canadian Rockies and the adjacent plains in northeastern British Columbia and west-central Alberta.

== Lithology ==
The Monteith Formation consists primarily of fine-grained argillaceous sandstone with interbeds of siltstone, dark grey mudstone, shale, and minor coal beds. Coarser-grained quartzose sandstones and minor quartz-pebble and chert conglomerates are present in some areas.

== Environment of deposition ==
The Monteith Formation was deposited in marine and nonmarine environments within and adjacent to the Western Interior Seaway. Depositional settings ranged from marine to shoreline, deltaic, river channel, floodplain, and swamp environments.

== Paleontology and age ==
The age of the Monach Formation formations has been determined from its fossil fauna, primarily species of the bivalve Buchia.

== Thickness and distribution ==
The Monteith Formation is present in the foothills of the Canadian Rockies and the adjacent plains from the Prophet River in northeastern British Columbia to the Berland River in west-central Alberta. It attains a maximum thickness of 600 m (1,970 ft) in the foothills of British Columbia and thins eastward.

== Relationship to other units ==
The Monteith Formation is the basal formation of the Minnes Group. It was deposited conformably over the marine shales of the Fernie Formation and is conformably overlain by the Beattie Peaks Formation. To the south it grades into the Nikanassin Formation.

== See also ==
- Various Contributors to the Paleobiology Database. "Fossilworks: Gateway to the Paleobiology Database".
- List of fossiliferous stratigraphic units in British Columbia
