= Minnes Group =

Stratigraphic unit in Canada

- Stratigraphic range: Mesozoic
- Type: Group
- Sub-units: Gorman Creek Formation; Bickford Formation; Monach Formation; Beattie Peaks Formation; Monteith Formation
- Underlies: Cadomin Formation
- Overlies: Fernie Formation
- Thickness: maximum 2,100 m (6,890 ft)

Lithology
- Primary: Sandstone
- Other: Siltstone, mudstone, coal

Location
- Coordinates: 54.1625°N 120.0667°W
- Region: British Columbia; Alberta
- Country: Canada

Type section
- Named for: Mount Minnes, British Columbia
- Named by: W.H. Ziegler and S.A.J. Pocock

The Minnes Group, originally named the Minnes Formation, is a geologic unit of latest Jurassic to earliest Cretaceous age in the Western Canada Sedimentary Basin. It is present in the northern foothills of the Canadian Rockies and the adjacent plains in northeastern British Columbia and west-central Alberta. Its strata include natural gas reservoirs and minor coal deposits. Fossil dinosaur tracks have been described from one of its formations.

== Stratigraphy and lithology ==
The strata of the Minnes Group were originally described as the Minnes Formation which was revised to group status by D.F. Stott. Stott subdivided the group into four formations in the north as shown below. South of the Pine River the upper three formations are not readily divisible and those beds are included in the Gorman Creek Formation.

North:

Formation	Age	Lithology	Maximum Thickness	Reference
Bickford Formation	Early Cretaceous (Valanginian)	interbedded sandstone, siltstone, and mudstone, with minor coal seams	400 m (1,310 ft)	
Monach Formation	Early Cretaceous (Valanginian)	quartzose sandstone, minor coal	350 m (1,150 ft)	
Beattie Peaks Formation	Early Cretaceous (Valanginian)	mudstone, siltstone, argillaceous sandstone	460 m (1,510 ft)	
Monteith Formation	Late Jurassic (Tithonian) to Early Cretaceous (Berriasian)	quartzose to argillaceous sandstone, with minor conglomerate, siltstone, mudstone, coal	600 m (1,970 ft)	

South:

Formation	Age	Lithology	Maximum Thickness	Reference
Gorman Creek Formation	Early Cretaceous (Valanginian)	argillaceous sandstone, siltstone, carbonaceous mudstone, and coal	1,200 m (3,940 ft)	
Monteith Formation	latest Jurassic (Tithonian) to Early Cretaceous (Berriasian)	quartzose to argillaceous sandstone, with minor conglomerate, siltstone, mudstone, coal	600 m (1,970 ft)	

== Environment of deposition ==
The formations of the Minnes Group were deposited in marine and nonmarine environments within and adjacent to the Western Interior Seaway. Depositional settings ranged from shallow marine to shoreline, coastal plain, deltaic, river channel, floodplain, and swamp environments.

== Paleontology and age ==
The age of the Minnes Group strata has been determined from their fossil fauna, primarily species of the bivalve Buchia. Ammonites, plant fossils, palynomorphs, and microfossils have also been described from the Minnes Group. Dinosaur trackways are present on bedding surfaces in the Gorman Creek Formation of the Minnes Group near the Narraway River:

"More than 200 fossil footprints are preserved in at least 8 trackways... The majority of the footprints were made by small theropods, but the most dramatic trackway was made by a large biped whose feet were more than a half meter in length."

== Thickness and distribution ==
The Minnes Group can be seen in outcrops in the northern foothills of the Canadian Rockies and is present beneath the adjacent plains from the Prophet River in northeastern British Columbia to the Berland River in west-central Alberta. It reaches a maximum thickness of 1,200 m (3,940 ft) in the foothills and thins eastward, reaching zero at its erosional edge.

== Relationship to other units ==
The Minnes Group was deposited conformably over the marine shales of the Fernie Formation, and was eroded prior to the deposition of the Cadomin Formation of the Bullhead Group which unconformably overlies it. The Minnes strata grade into those of the Nikanassin Formation to the south in Alberta.

== Economic Resources ==
The Minnes Group contains natural gas reservoirs in the subsurface of the Peace River Plains and Deep Basin areas, where it is sometimes reported as "Nikanassin Formation". Coal seams and carbonaceous shales, which may have been the source for much of the gas, are also present in the Minnes Group, but none of the coal deposits have been found to be economically mineable.

== See also ==
- List of stratigraphic units with theropod tracks
