= Lupata Gorge =

Gorge on the Zambezi River in Mozambique

- Gorge
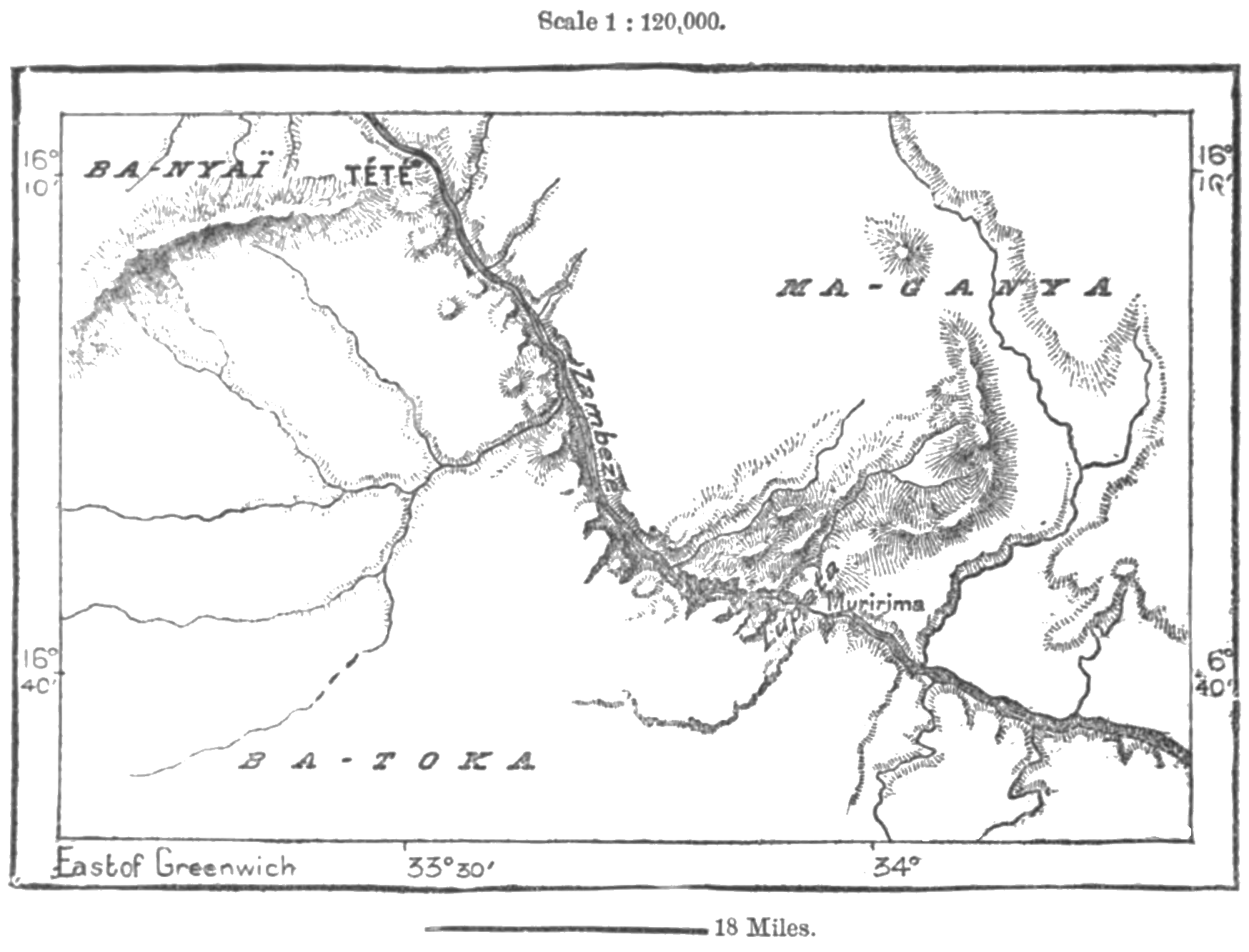
- 1893 map showing the Lupata Gorge (near Muririma)

- Location within Mozambique
- Coordinates: 16.61°S 34.00°E
- Location: Mozambique
- Water bodies: Zambezi River

The Lupata Gorge is a gorge on the Zambezi River in Mozambique, approximately 100km from Tete. It marks the division between the Middle Zambezi and Lower Zambezi.
