= Morrissey Ridge =

Mountain range in British Columbia, Canada

- Location within British Columbia

Geography
- Country: Canada
- Province: British Columbia
- Range coordinates: 49°26′41″N 114°59′24″W
- Parent range: Front Ranges
- Topo map: NTS 82G7 Flathead Ridge

Morrissey Ridge is a mountain range of the Front Ranges located south-east of Fernie.

== See also ==
- Ranges of the Canadian Rockies
