= Kootenay Group =

Stratigraphic unit in Canada

- Stratigraphic range: Late Jurassic to Early Cretaceous
- Type: Group
- Sub-units: Elk Formation; Mist Mountain Formation; Morrissey Formation
- Underlies: Blairmore Group
- Overlies: Fernie Formation
- Thickness: maximum 1,335 m (4,380 ft)

Lithology
- Primary: Sandstone, siltstone, mudstone
- Other: Coal, conglomerate

Location
- Region: Canadian Rockies
- Country: Canada

Type section
- Named by: D. W. Gibson, 1979

The Kootenay Group, originally called the Kootenay Formation, is a geologic unit of latest Jurassic to earliest Cretaceous age in the Western Canada Sedimentary Basin that is present in the southern and central Canadian Rockies and foothills. It includes economically important deposits of high-rank bituminous and semi-anthracite coal, as well as plant fossils and dinosaur trackways.

== Stratigraphy and lithology ==
The strata of the Kootenay Group were originally described as the Kootenay Formation. D.W. Gibson revised the sequence as the Kootenay Group and defined it as encompassing the stratigraphic interval between the Jurassic Fernie Formation and the Lower Cretaceous Blairmore Group. He subdivided it into three formations as shown below and designated a type section for each of the formations, thus eliminating the need for a type section for the group.

Formation	Age	Lithology	Maximum Thickness	Reference
Elk Formation	earliest Cretaceous	interbedded sandstone, siltstone, mudstone, conglomerate; rare thin coal seams	590 m (1,940 ft)	
Mist Mountain Formation	latest Jurassic to earliest Cretaceous	interbedded sandstone, siltstone, mudstone, shale, and mineable coal seams; rare conglomerate	665 m (2,180 ft)	
Morrissey Formation	latest Jurassic	massive cliff-forming fine- to medium-grained sandstone	80 m (260 ft)	

== Environment of deposition ==
The Kootenay Group is an eastward-thinning wedge of sediments derived from the erosion of newly uplifted mountains to the west. The sediments were transported eastward by river systems and deposited in a variety of river channel, floodplain, swamp, coastal plain, deltaic and shoreline environments along the western edge of the Western Interior Seaway.

== Paleontology ==
Fossils are rare in the Morrissey Formation, but the Mist Mountain Formation includes plant fossils and dinosaur trackways, and the Elk Formation includes plant fossils, trace fossils and bivalves.

== Thickness and distribution ==
The Kootenay Group is present in the front ranges and foothills of the Canadian Rockies in southeastern British Columbia and southwestern Alberta. It extends from the Canada–US border to north of the North Saskatchewan River. It has a maximum thickness of about 1,355 metres (4,450 ft), and it thins eastward.

== Relationship to other units ==
The Kootenay Group conformably overlies the marine shales of the Fernie Formation. In most areas it is disconformably overlain by the nonmarine strata of the Blairmore Group, although in some western areas the contact may be conformable.

North of the North Saskatchewan River the Kootenay Group grades into the Nikanassin Formation. To the south it may correlate with the upper part of the Morrison Formation in Montana. It was originally mis-correlated with the Kootenai Formation which underlies the Morrison.

== See also ==
- List of fossiliferous stratigraphic units in British Columbia
- List of stratigraphic units with theropod tracks
