= Clearwater River (Alberta) =

River in Alberta, Canada

Coordinates: 52°21′43″N 114°56′52″W

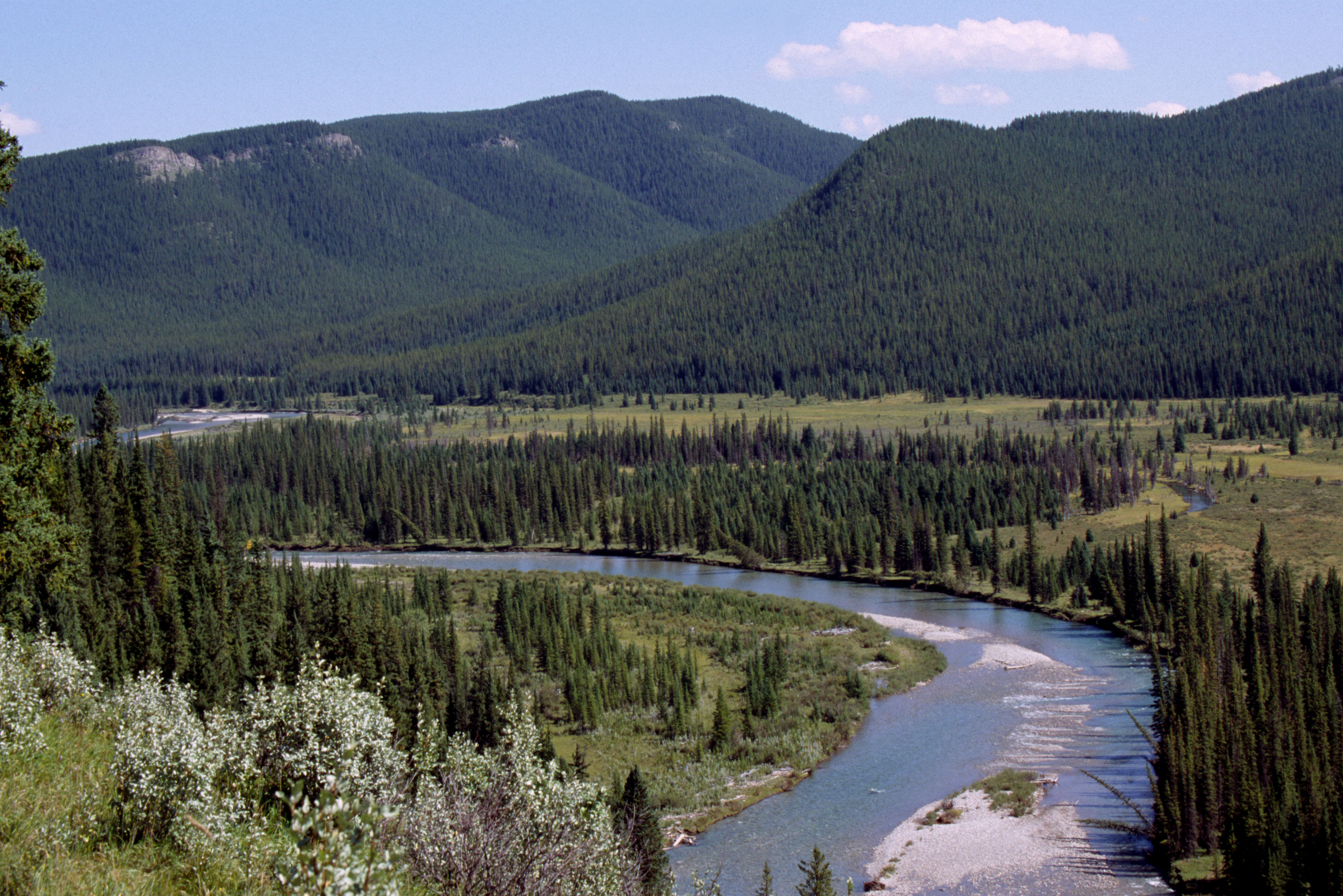
The Clearwater River of southwestern Alberta

Clearwater is a river of southern Alberta, Canada. Situated entirely in the Canadian Rockies and the Rocky Mountain foothills of Alberta, it is a glacier-fed upper-reach tributary of the North Saskatchewan River. The upper reach of the Clearwater has become popular for equestrian travellers due to the natural setting along the river.

== Course ==
When measuring from Trident Lake, the Clearwater River has a length of 203 kilometres (126 mi) and descends 350 metres (1,150 ft) to its end at Rocky Mountain House.

- The river begins in Banff National Park on the southern slope of Mount Willingdon immediately into the Devon Lakes at Clearwater Pass.
- From the Devon Lakes it flows 11 kilometres (7 mi) and descends 400 metres (1,300 ft) to Clearwater Lake.
- About 2 kilometres (1.2 mi) after Clearwater Lake and 50 metres (160 ft) down the river hits Trident Lake, where it becomes navigable by canoe, although it is not recommended for paddling until it reaches Timber Creek (40 kilometres (25 mi) downstream) because of dangerous and variable river-wide log jams.
- After traveling 15 kilometres (9 mi) east and descending 120 metres (390 ft), the river exits Banff National Park. There are two class III rapids, and a dangerous blind corner that feeds "Heart Attack Log Jam" (a nearly river-wide log jam that requires very good class III paddling skills and tight manoeuvring to successfully navigate) before reaching Banff Park boundary.
- The river travels east 18 kilometres (11 mi) more and descends 150 metres (490 ft) before turning north and exiting the Ram Range in the Rocky Mountain Foothills. There is one class III rapid a little outside the park boundary, many tight log gardens, and braided channels that end in complete obstruction by logs, as well as one section just downstream of the wagon crossing where the river dives through mature forest and logs with no navigable channel, requiring a 50-metre portage through dense bush and logs. Due to the lack of road access, the many logs and log jams and relative lack of interesting-enough whitewater to make up for the long boat haul to reach the put-in, the stretch of river from Trident Lake to about 40 kilometres (25 mi) downstream (Timber Creek) saw its first successful descent by canoe in nearly fifty years, by Warren and Paul Finlay on June 26, 2021, having been first navigated in modern days by the Wild Rivers Survey, Planning Division, Parks Canada in 1973.
- About 20 kilometres (12 mi) further along, the river turns east again and meets its first road around Idlewild Mountain.
- About 70 kilometres (43 mi) later, the river turns northwest.
- About 30 kilometres (19 mi) further, the river empties into the North Saskatchewan River.

== Tributaries ==
- Martin Creek
- Roaring Creek
- Malloch Creek
- Peters Creek
- Forbidden Creek
- Timber Creek
- Washout Creek
- Peppers Creek
- Elk Creek
- Idlewild Creek
- Cuttoff Creek
- Rock Creek
- Limestone Creek
- Seven Mile Creek
- Pineneedle Creek
- Tay River
- Alford Creek
- Prairie Creek

== Photo gallery ==
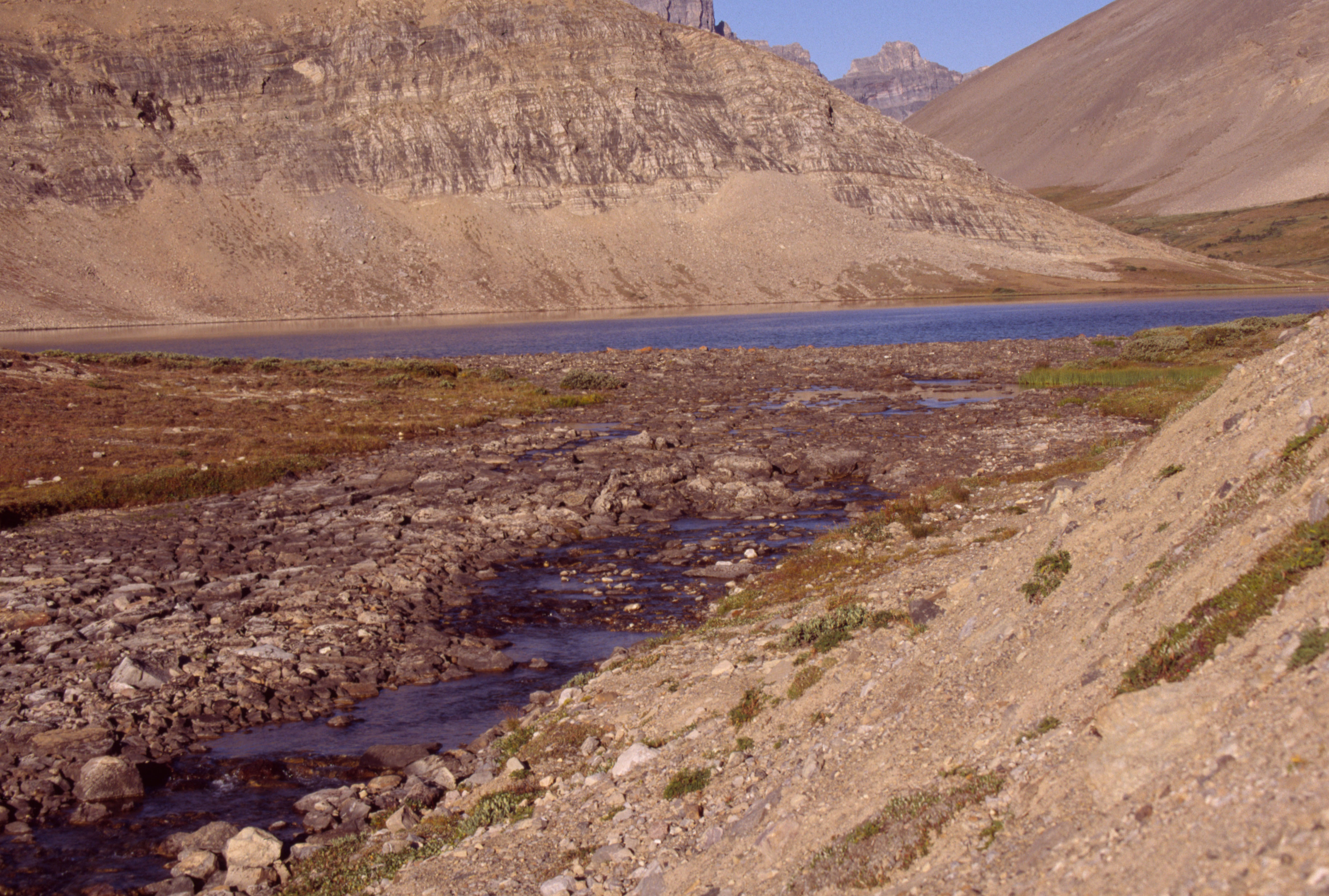
Origin of Clearwater River from the Devon Lakes

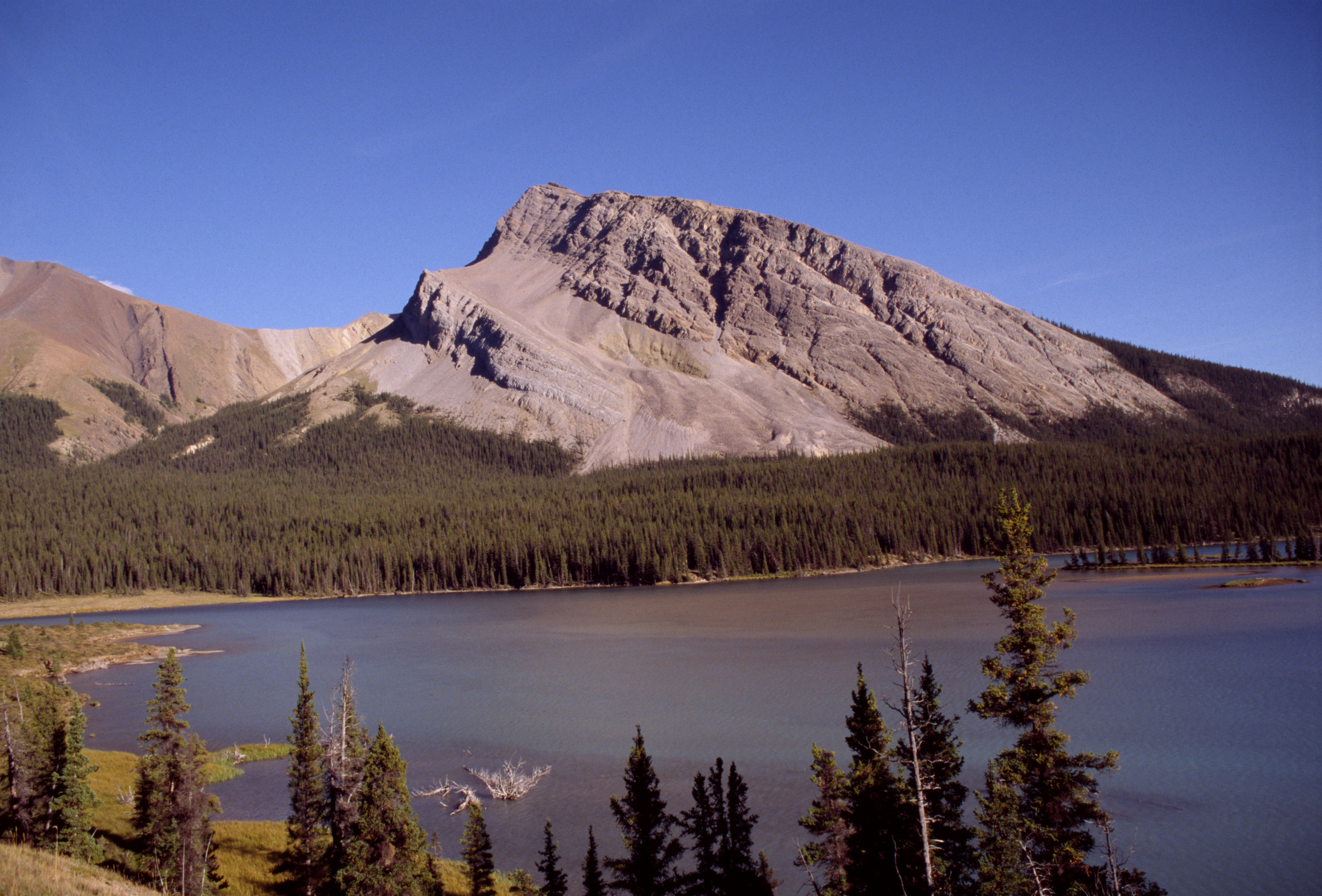
Trident Lake along the Clearwater River

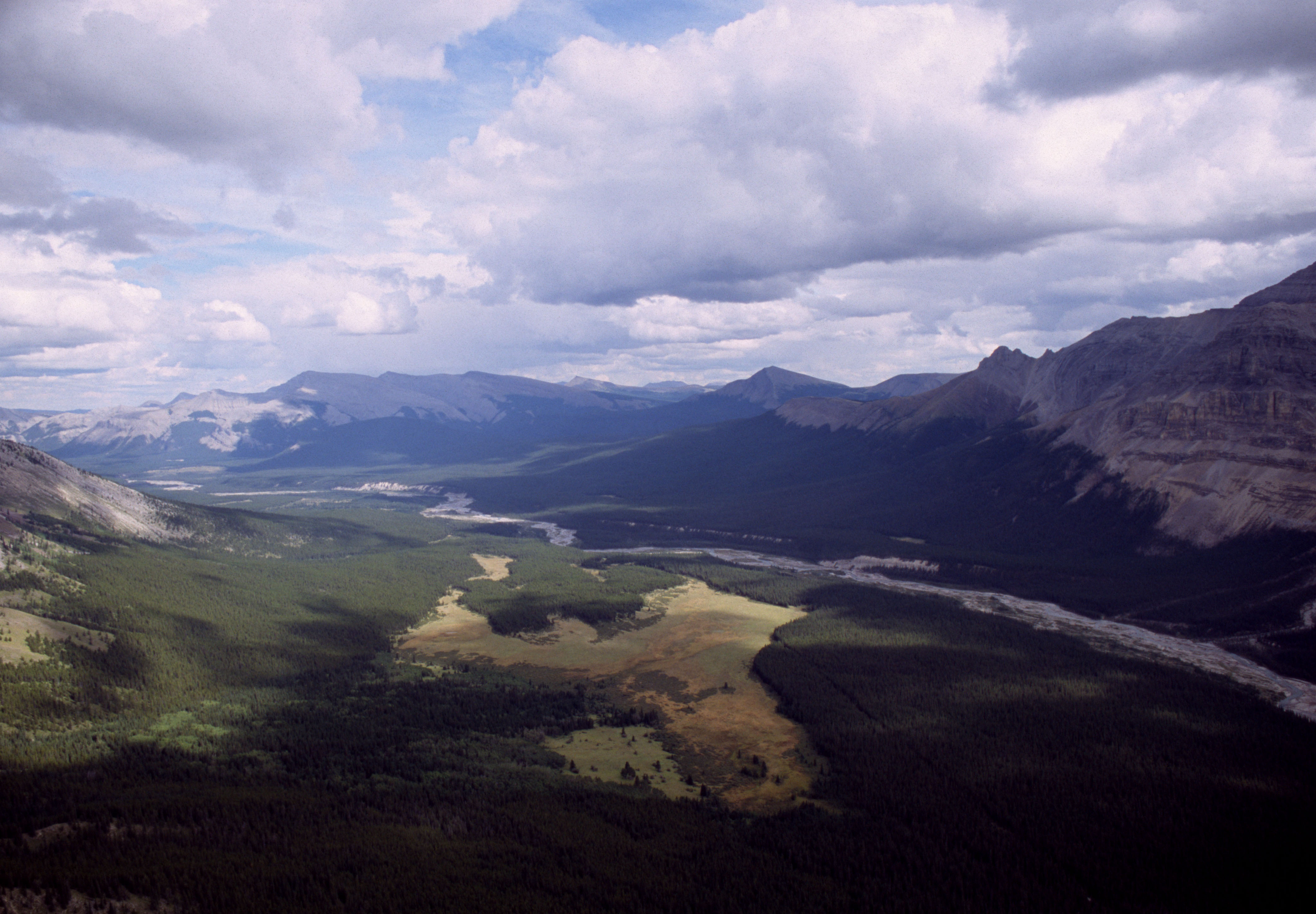
Clearwater River in the Canadian Rockies

== See also ==
- List of rivers of Alberta
