= Cadomin Formation =

Geological formation in Canada

- Stratigraphic range: Early Cretaceous
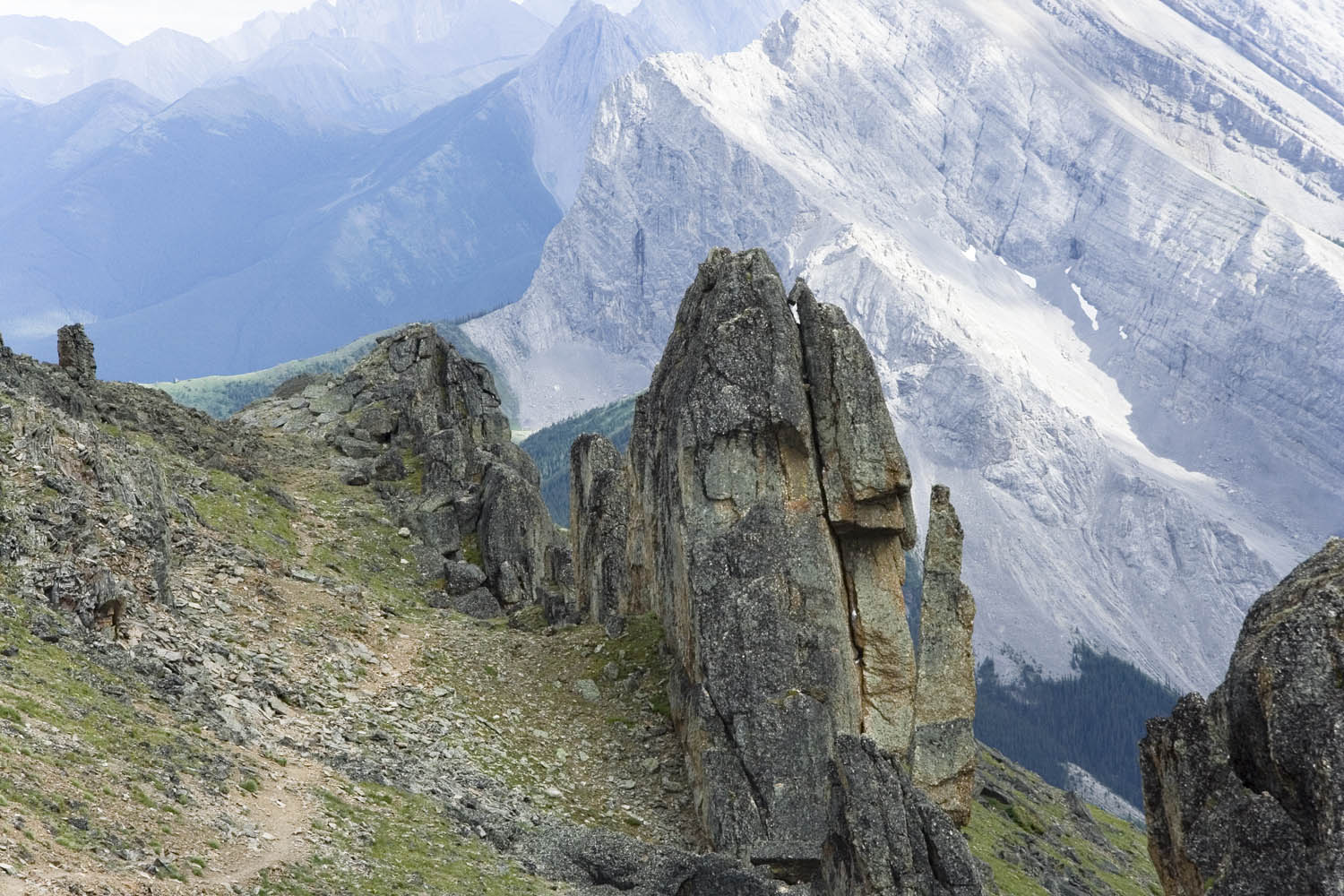
- Cadomin Formation outcrops, Centennial Ridge Trail, Mount Allan, Kananaskis, Alberta
- Type: Geological formation
- Unit of: Bullhead Group, Blairmore Group, Luscar Group
- Underlies: Gething Formation, Gladstone Formation
- Overlies: Kootenay Group, Nikanassin Formation, Minnes Group, Fernie Group
- Thickness: up to more than 170 metres (560 ft)

Lithology
- Primary: Conglomerate, sandstone
- Other: Shale, coal

Location
- Coordinates: 53°00′N 117°19′W
- Region: Alberta; British Columbia
- Country: Canada

Type section
- Named for: Cadomin, Alberta
- Named by: B.R. Mackay

The Cadomin Formation is a stratigraphic unit of Early Cretaceous (Barremian to Aptian) age in the western part of the Western Canada Sedimentary Basin. It is extends from southeastern British Columbia through western Alberta to northeastern British Columbia, and it contains significant reservoirs of natural gas in some areas. It was named after the mining town of Cadomin, which is an acronym of "Canadian Dominion Mining".

== Stratigraphy ==
The Cadomin Formation is of Early Cretaceous (Barremian to Aptian) age. It is the basal unit of the Bullhead Group in northeastern British Columbia and of the Blairmore Group in Alberta. The formation is a distinctive marker horizon, and it was sometimes called the "coal conglomerate" because it was useful as a reference point for locating the coal seams of the underlying Mist Mountain Formation and the overlying Gething Formation. It is not fossiliferous.

== Lithology ==
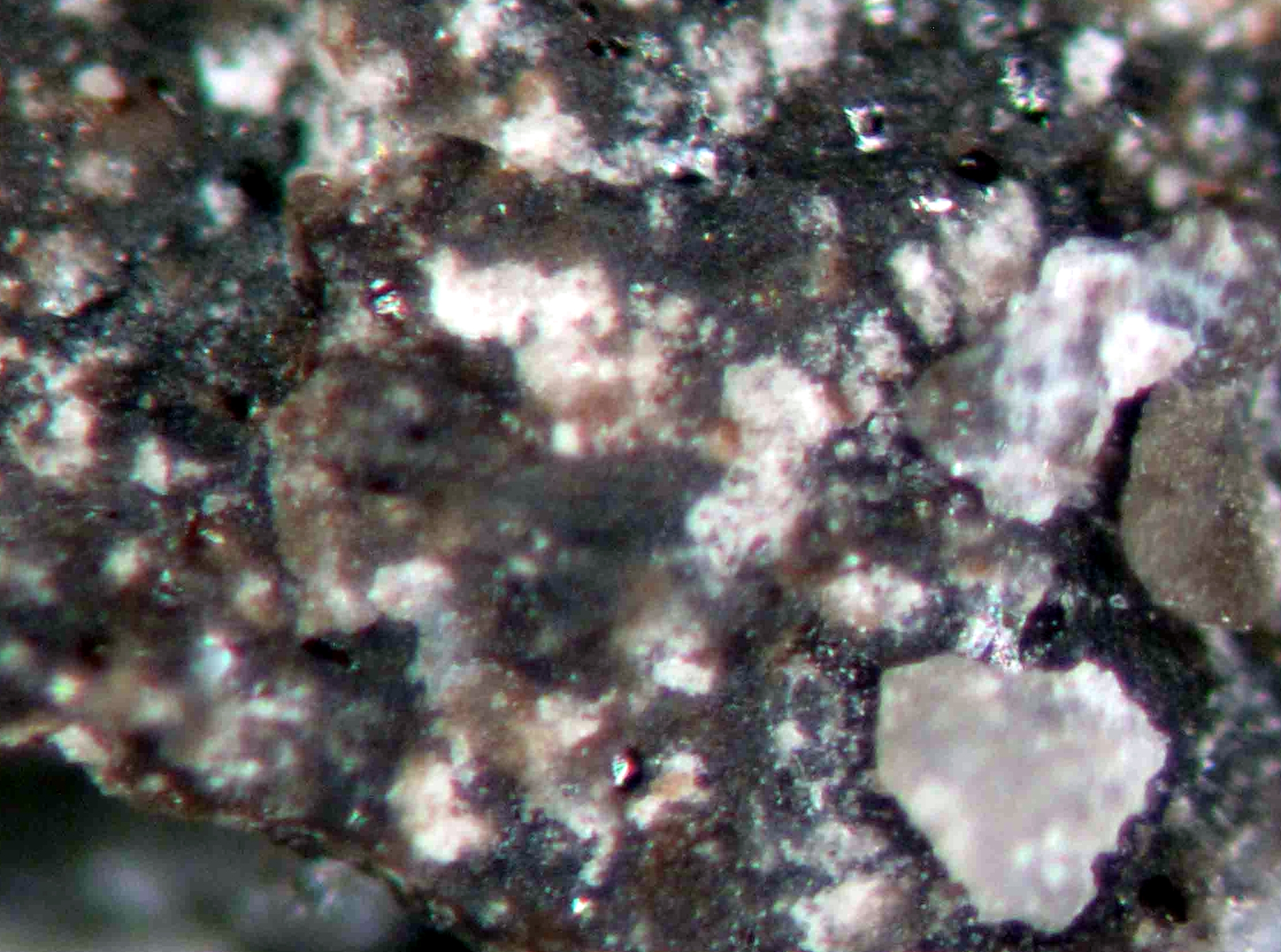
A photomicrograph of Cadomin Formation sandstone.

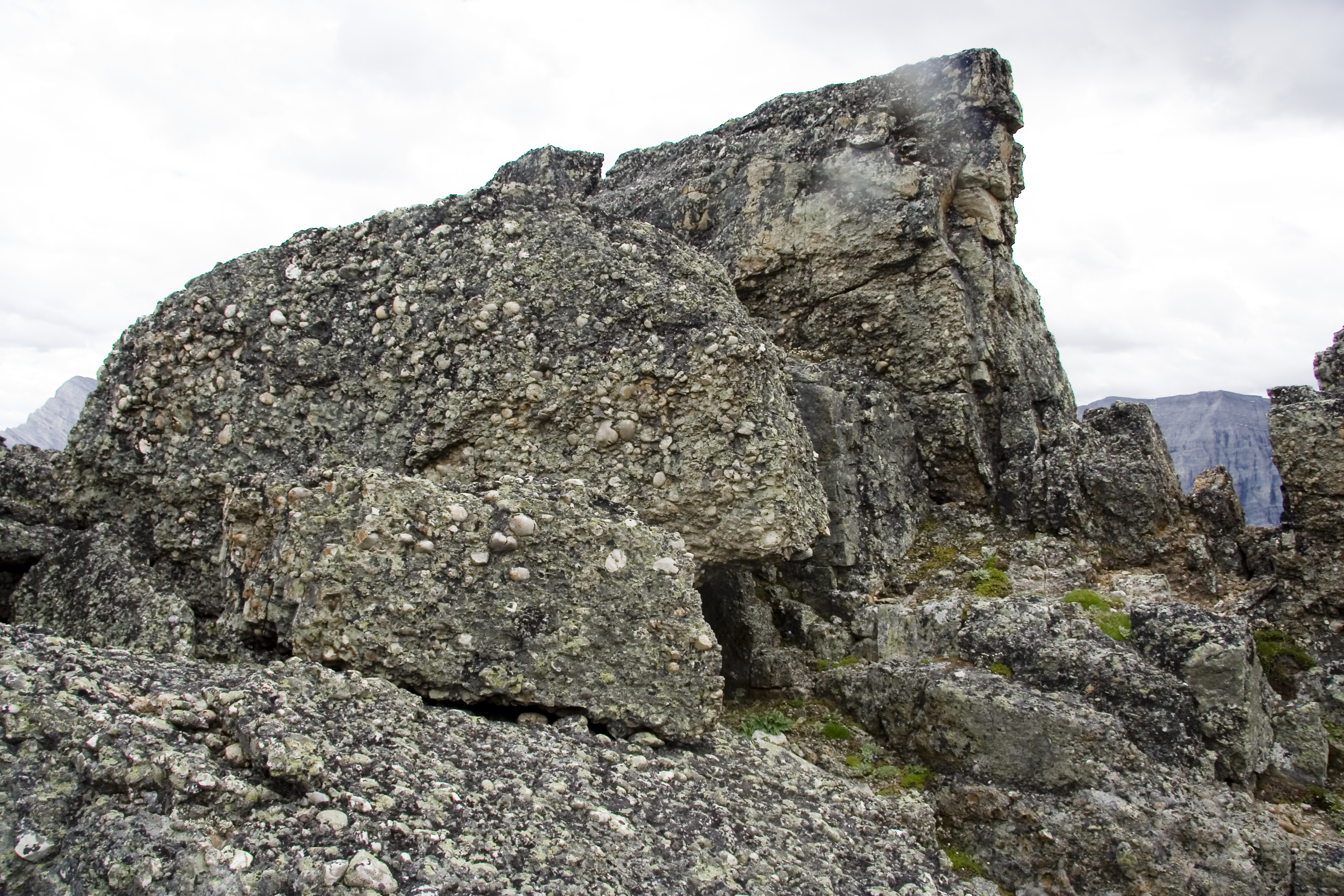
Rounded pebbles and cobbles in the Cadomin Formation, Centennial Ridge Trail, Mount Allan, Alberta.

The formation consists primarily of conglomerate, although at some localities there are minor interbeds of coarse-grained sandstone, shale, and coal. The conglomerate is typically massive and consists of well-rounded pebbles, cobbles and boulders of white, grey and green chert, and white and grey quartzite, in a matrix of quartzose sand. In some areas there are also minor pebbles, cobbles and boulders of limestone, dolomite, black argillite and, rarely, greenish volcanics. The conglomerate and sandstone beds are cemented with silica, making them very hard and resistant to erosion, so they tend to form prominent outcrops.

== Environment of deposition ==
Deposition of the Cadomin Formation marked the renewal of subsidence and sedimentation following a long period of uplift, exposure and erosion of older strata. The Cadomin sediments were derived from sources in the mountains to the west, and were deposited across the pediment surface by systems of alluvial fans and braided streams. It is postulated that the streams flowed generally northeastward, turning northwestward at the Fox Creek Escarpment.

== Paleontology ==
The Cadomin Formation preserves the oldest dinosaur skeletal fossils from Alberta (and anywhere west of Nova Scotia in Canada). The fossil material is attributable to a polacanthid ankylosaur, and comes from the basal unit of the Cadomin formation known as the Pocaterra Creek member. Unattributed turtle material was also reported from the formation, and the same locality as the dinosaur material.

== Distribution ==
Outcrops near Cadomin, Alberta are the type locality. The formation is exposed at the surface in the foothills of the Canadian Rockies, extending from the Canada–US border in southeastern British Columbia and southwestern Alberta and to the Peace River region in northeastern British Columbia, a distance of more than 1,000 kilometers (620 mi). It is also recognizable in the subsurface east of the foothills. It ranges in thickness from 1 metre (3.3 ft) to more than 170 metres (560 ft) and is generally thicker and more coarse grained in the west.

== Relationship to other units ==
The Cadomin Formation overlies a major regional unconformity caused by pre-Cadomin erosion, although little or no evidence of the angular nature of that unconformity is apparent at most outcrops. It rests unconformably on the Fernie Formation, the Nikanassin Formation, the Minnes Group or the Kootenay Group, depending on the location and the extent of the erosion. It is conformably overlain by the Gladstone Formation in Alberta and Gething Formation in northeastern British Columbia, and it is equivalent to the base of the Mannville Group.

== Hydrocarbon production ==
Natural gas is produced from the Cadomin Formation in the Deep Basin area of western Alberta in the Hinton-Grande Cache-Grande Prairie area, and in the Cutbank area in northeastern British Columbia.

== Gallery ==
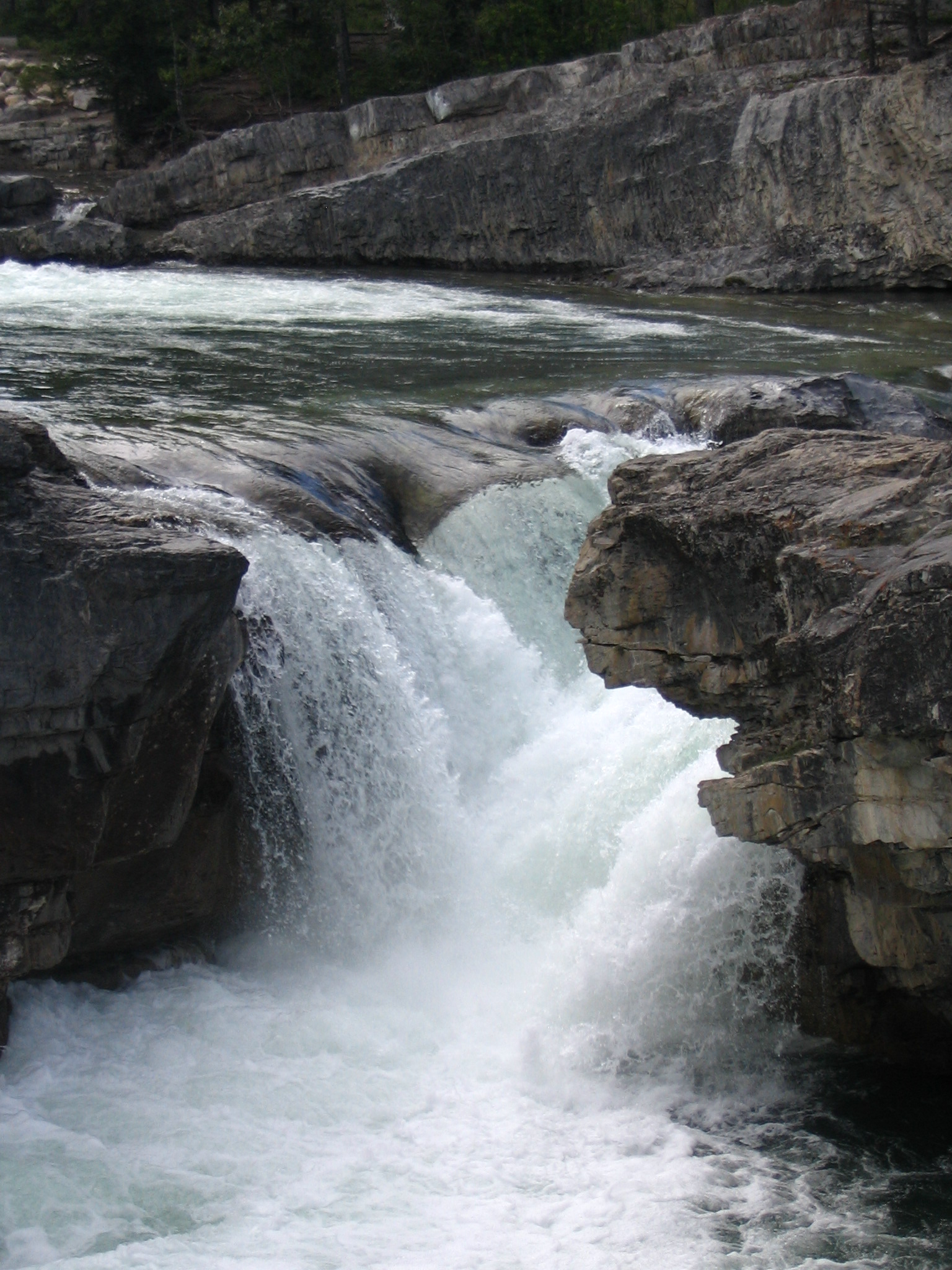
Elbow Falls flows over a Cadomin Formation outcrop.

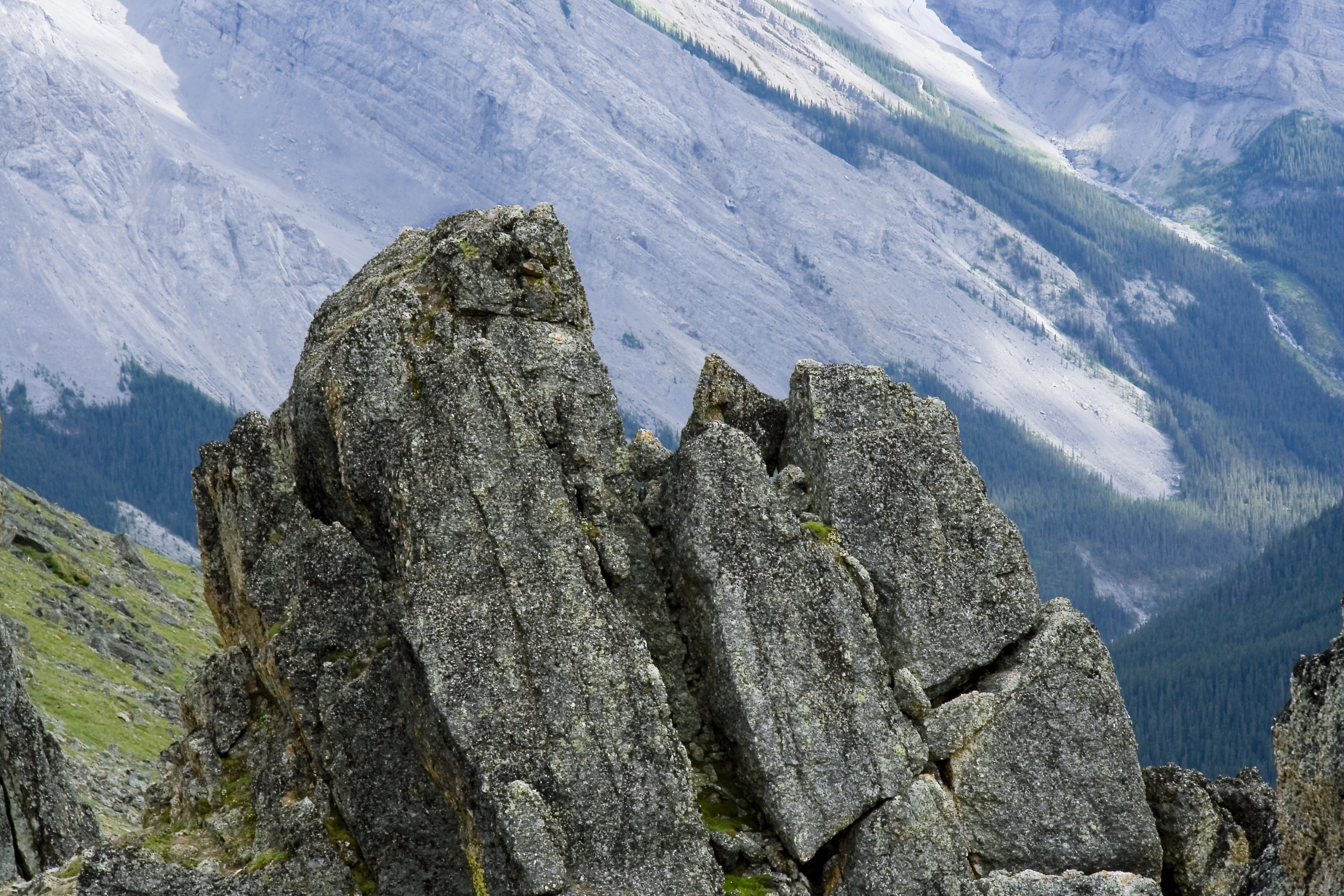
Cadomin Formation outcrops along the Centennial Ridge Trail, Mount Allan, Alberta.
