= Nikanassin Formation =

Stratigraphic unit in Canada

- Stratigraphic range: Portlandian to Barremian
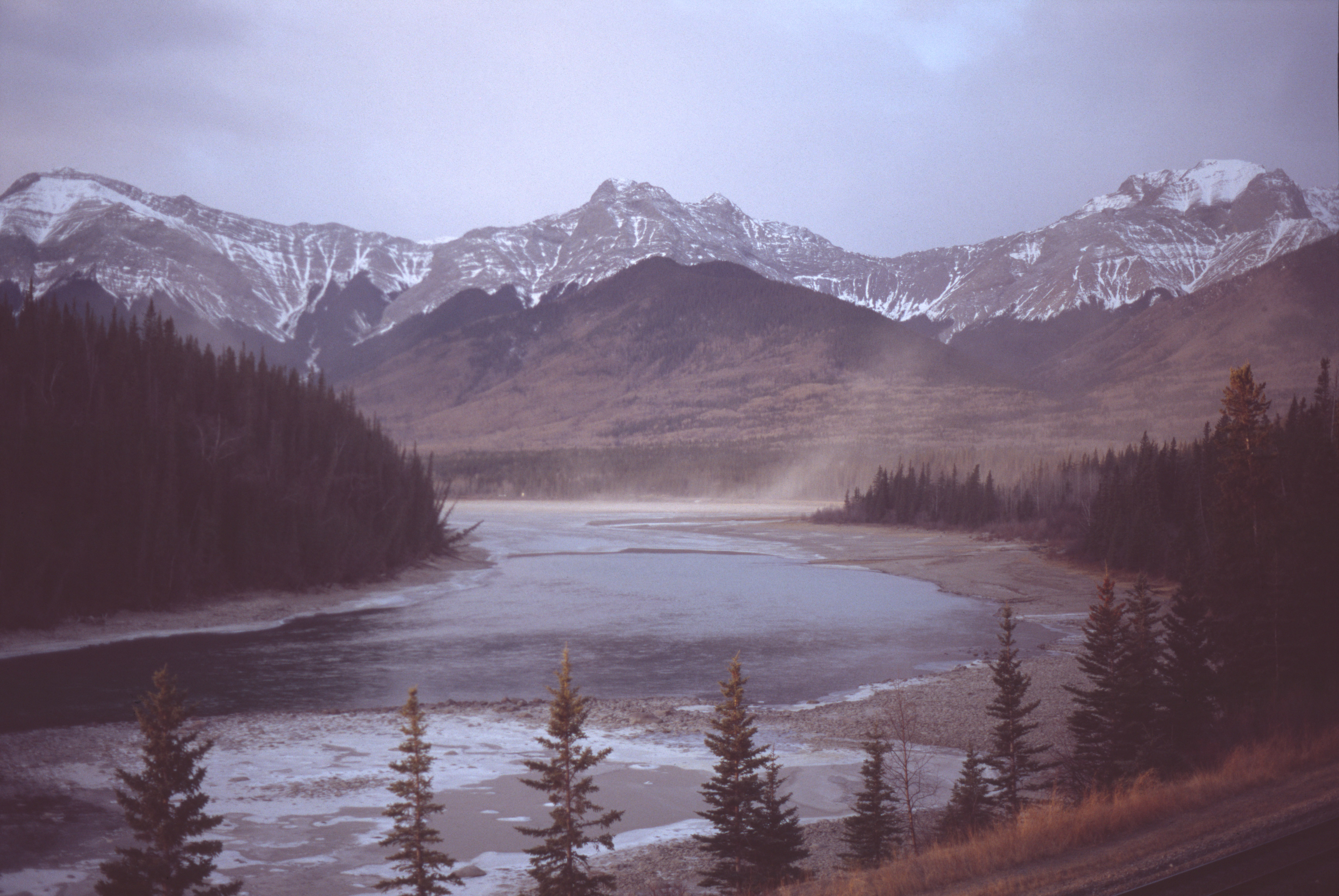
- Nikanassin Formation near Brule
- Type: Geological formation
- Underlies: Cadomin Formation
- Overlies: Fernie Formation
- Thickness: 400 meters (1,300 ft) to 0

Lithology
- Primary: Sandstone, shale
- Other: Coal

Location
- Coordinates: 53°17′21″N 117°52′34″W
- Region: Western Canada Sedimentary Basin
- Country: Canada

Type section
- Named for: Nikanassin Range
- Named by: MacKay, 1929

The Nikanassin Formation is a stratigraphic unit of Late Jurassic (Portlandian) to Early Cretaceous (Barremian) age. It is present along the western edge of the Western Canada Sedimentary Basin in western Alberta and northeastern British Columbia. Its name was first proposed by D.B. Dowling in 1909 (Coal Fields South of Grand Trunk Pacific Railway, in the foothills of the Rocky Mountain, Alberta Page 140 paragraph 4 " to this it is proposed to give the name Nikanassin, from the Cree word meaning outer range" Also it is noted on the map by D.B. Dowling.(Geological Survey of Canada. Incorrect info follows: It was named by B.R. MacKay in 1929 for the Nikanassin Range of the front-central ranges of the Canadian Rockies (Nikanassin means "first range" in Cree). Mackay did not designate a type locality for the formation, although he described outcrops near the hamlet of Brûlé, north of the Yellowhead Highway outside of Jasper National Park.

== Depositional history ==
The Nikanassin Formation grades from marine sediments at the base to coastal and continental at the top. The sediments were derived from newly uplifted mountains to the west and deposited along the western margin of the Western Interior Seaway, which is represented by the marine shales of the Fernie Formation.

== Lithology ==
The Nikanassin consists primarily of marine sandstones interbedded with dark grey shales. The sandstones are dark grey, hard, mostly quartzose, and fine- to medium-grained. In the foothills the upper beds are nonmarine and include thin coal beds and carbonaceous shales. There are no commercially significant coal beds.

== Thickness and distribution ==
The Nikanassin thickens northward from the foothills near the North Saskatchewan River, reaching a maximum of about 400 meters (1,300 ft) near Brûlé. From there it thins toward the east and north. It extends into the southernmost part of northeastern British Columbia, where it transitions into the Minnes Group.

== Relationship to other units ==
The Nikanassin is roughly equivalent to the Kootenay Group of the southern Alberta foothills and the Minnes Group north of northeastern British Columbia. It conformably overlies and interfingers with the "Passage Beds" at the top of the Fernie Formation.

A major period of regional erosion occurred after the deposition of the Nikanassin, removing some of the uppermost Nikanassin strata prior to the deposition of the overlying conglomerates of the Cadomin Formation. The contact between the two formations is thus sharp and unconformable.
